= List of stock used by Swiss Federal Railways =

The following is an incomplete list of locomotives and multiple units used by the Swiss Federal Railways.

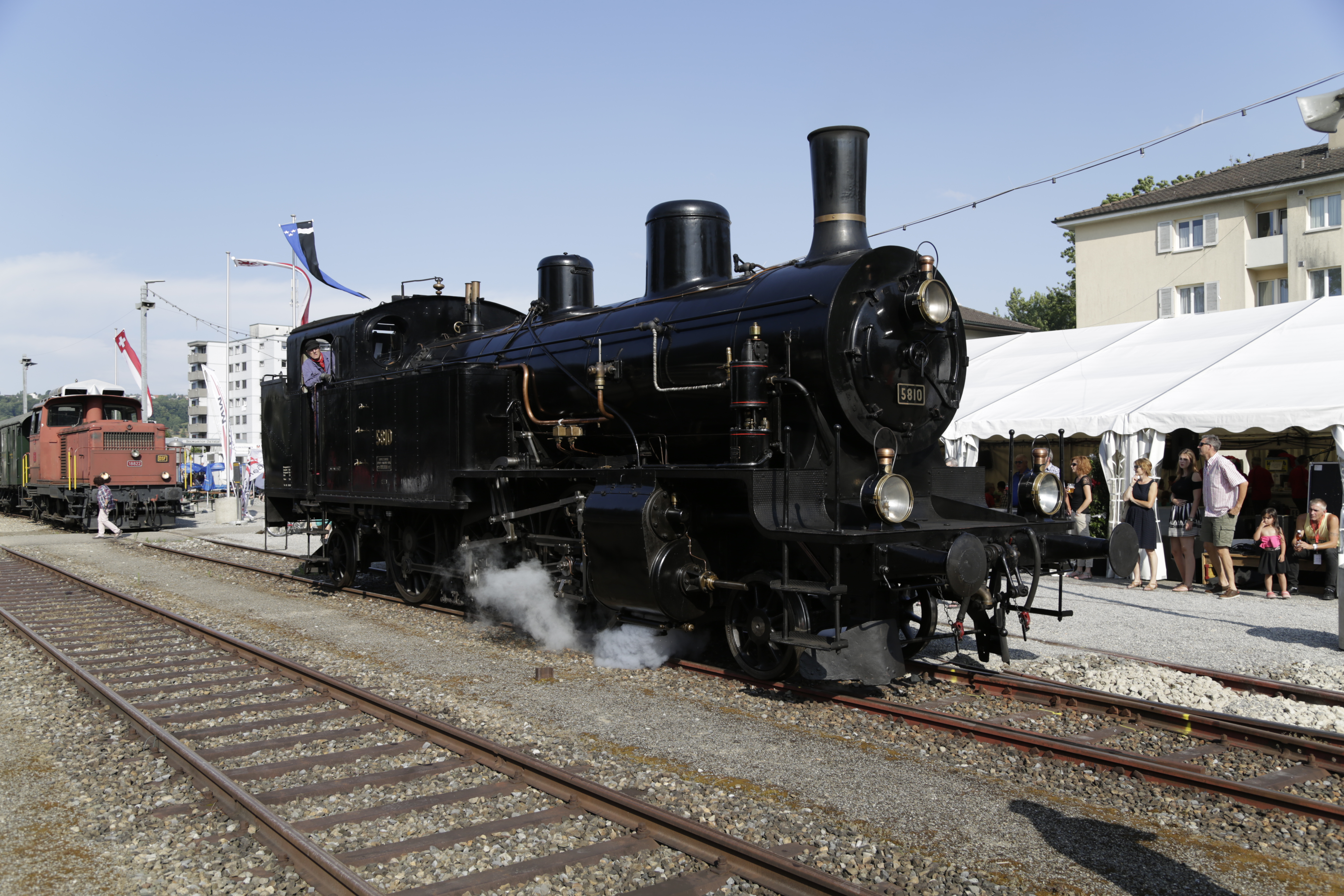
SBB Eb 3/5

== Steam locomotives ==
Steam locomotives
Class (original)		Origin	Manufacturer	Years Constructed	Quantity delivered	Quantity in service	Maximum speed (km/h)	Power (kW)	Withdrawn from service	Comments
Type	Numbers	Origin	Manufacturer	Years Constructed	Quantity delivered	Quantity in service	Maximum speed (km/h)	Power (kW)	Withdrawn from service	Comments
A 2/4	101–130	JS 101–130	SLM	1892–1896	30	—	90		1917–1926	
A 2/4	151–175	NOB 101–125	SLM	1896–1906	50	—	90		1917–1925	
A 2/4	176–200	(new)	SLM	1896–1906	50	—	90		1917–1925	
A 2/4	401–515	SCB 251–265	SLM	1897–1903	20	—	90		1923	Four-cylinder compound
A 2/4	416–420	(new)	SLM	1897–1903	20	—	90		1923	Four-cylinder compound
A 3/5	501–502		SLM	1907	2	—	100		1933	
A 3/5	601–649		SLM	1907–1915	49	—	100		1934–1946	Four-cylinder superheated compound, 22 sold to Nederlandse Spoorwegen in 1946
A 3/5	651–652		SLM	1907	2	—	100		1934–1946	Four-cylinder saturated compound with Brotan boiler; renumbered 810–811 in 1913
A 3/5	701–702	JS 231–232	SLM	1902-1909	109	1	100	809	1926–1964	Four-cylinder saturated (later superheated) compound
A 3/5	703-809	(new)	SLM	1902-1909	109	1	100	809	1926–1964	Four-cylinder saturated (later superheated) compound
A 3/5	901–930	GB 201–230	SLM	1894–1905	30	—	90		1923–27	
A 3/5	931–938	GB 931–934 GB 935–938	Maffei 2727–2730 SLM 1892–1895	1908	8	—	90		1925	
B 2/3	1071–1072	VSB 45–46	VSB	1876	2	—	75		1903	Engerth locomotive
B 2/3	1074–1079	JS 74–75	AK 1085–87, 1277/78/76	1868, 1870	6	—	75		1904–1907	
B 2/3	1080–1082	JS 80–82	SACM 2481–83	1875	3	—			1903	
B 2/3	1161–1190	NOB 51–80	SLM		30	—				
B 3/4	1301–1369		SLM	1905–1916	69	1	75	730	1934–1964	
B 3/4	1421–1424	JS 201–204	SLM							
B 3/4	1431–1452	NOB 171–192	SLM							
B 3/4	1461–1467	SCB 111–117	SCB 45-51	1887–1889	7	—			1917	
B 3/4	1471–1485	SCB 201–210 SCB 211–215	SACM 4420–4429 SLM 1001–1005	1892 1896	15	—			1925	
B 3/4	1486–1495	SCB 216–225	SLM 1253–1262	1900	10	—			1926–1928	
B 3/4	1561–1578	JS 205–222	SLM							
B 3/4	1581–1595	VSB 101–115	SLM	1890–1901	15	—	75	515	1913–1929	Two-cylinder compound
B 3/4	1601–1675	JS 301–375	SLM	1896–1907	147	—	75	662	1923–1945	Three-cylinder compound, 5 sold to Nederlandse Spoorwegen in 1945
B 3/4	1676–1747	(new)	SLM	1896–1907	147	—	75	662	1923–1945	Three-cylinder compound, 5 sold to Nederlandse Spoorwegen in 1945
C 2/2	2151–2193	NOB 207–249	Krauss, MFE	1872–1876	43	—			1904–1917	
C 2/3	2219–2220	GB 19–20	Karlsruhe 1068–69	1883	2	—			1911, 1913	
C 3/3	2401...2416	JS 404...431	AK, SACM							
C 3/3	2421–2448	NOB 323–326, NOB 327–350	SLM 571–574 MFE 1263–68, 1444–52, 1502–07, 1543–46	1889 1873–1876						
C 3/3	2451–2470	VSB 1–20	Escher-Wyss, MFE	1855–1859	20	—			1903–1931	
C 3/3	2481–2487	VSB 151–154 VSB 155–157	Hartmann 1814–17 SLM 1070–72	1892 1897	7	—			1915–1924	
C 4/5	2601–2619		SLM	1907–1912	19	—	65		1930–1935	
C 4/5	2701–2732		SLM	1904–1906	32	—	65	772	1931–1963	Four-cylinder compound
C 4/5	2801–2808	GB 2801–2808	Maffei 2576–81	1906	8	—	65		1925	Four-cylinder compound
C 5/6	2901–2902		SLM	1913	2	—	65		1933	Four-cylinder simple
C 5/6	2951–2978		SLM	1913–1917	28	1	65	1074	1954–1968	Four-cylinder compound. Nicknamed «Elephant»
D 3/3	3351–3399	JS 501...555	(various)	1858–1892	49	—	50		1897–1925	
D 3/3	3401–3414	NOB 361–376	SLM	1891–1895	16	—			1911–1923	
D 3/3	3421–3425	JS 561–565	SLM	1890	5	—			1916	
D 3/3	3441...3446	GB 41–46	Krauss 414–417 Karlsruhe 917–918	1874–76	4				1906–1912	44 and 45 withdrawn before SBB takeover
D 3/3	3451–3483	GB 51–66 GB 67–83	MFE 1845–60 SLM 633-34, 653–55, 819–25, 930–34	1881–82 1890–95	33	—			1912–1925	
D 3/3	3601–3618	NOB 377–393	SLM	1897–1900	18	—			1925–1927	
D 3/3	3616–3624		SLM	1902	6	—			1927	
D 3/3	3699	JS 502	Cail/SOS	1858/1888	1	—			1913	Two-cylinder compound from JS 501–565 series
D 4/4	4001–4005	GB 141–145	SLM 1391–95	1901	5	—	45		1926–1928	
D 4/4	4101–4136	GB 101–131 GB 132–136	Maffei 1262–1276, 1301–08, 1410–13, 1543–46 SLM 939–43	1882–1890 1895	36	—	45		1912–1923	
D 2×2/2	4601–4612	SCB 169–180	SLM	1897–1900	12	—	55		1923–1926	Mallet locomotive
Ea 2/4	5031–5033	GB 31–33	Maffei 1548–50	1872	3	—			1923	
Eb 2/4	5425–5430	GB 25–30	Krauss 1007–1012	1882	6	—			1915–27	
Eb 2/4	5434–5435	SCB 18–19	MFE 1179–80	1872	2	—	75		1903–1904	
Eb 2/4	5441–5442	JS 13–14	SLM	1876	1	—	70		1903–1904	
Eb 2/4	5451–5476	JS 17–42	MFE, SLM	1880–1892	26	1	75		1911–1947	
Eb 2/4	5481–5495	SCB 146–160	SACM, SLM	1893–1896	15	—	75		1915–1938	
Eb 2/4	5595–5599	SCB 141–145	SLM	1891	5	—	75		1923–1924	
Eb 2/5	5680–5699	VSB 21–40	MFE	1857–58	20	—			1902–1925	Engerth locomotives
Eb 3/5	5801–5834		SLM	1911–1916	34	2	75		1950–1965	Nicknamed «Habersack»
Eb 3/5	5881–5889	BT 1–9	Maffei 3121–2129	1910	9	2	75		1959–1965	
Ec 3/4	6501–6512	JS 601–612								
Ec 3/4	6513–6529									
Ec 3/4	6551–6558	JN 146–153	SLM 441–44, 1053-55, 1223	1886, 1897, 1899	8	—	65		1935–38	
Ec 3/4	6581–6592	GB 181–192	MFE 1865–72 SLM 332–335							
Ec 2/5	6995–6999	SCB 1...38	MFE 255...410	1854–1858	5	1	60	296	1905–1906	Engerth locomotives
Ed 2×2/2	7681–7696	SCB 181–196	Maffei	1891–1893	16	1	55	515	1910–1938	Mallet locomotives
Ed 4/5	7701–7702	JN 154–155	SLM 1539–1540	1903	2	—	55		1923	
E 3/3	8384	TTB 1	SLM	1875	1	—	45		1938	
E 3/3	8395–8397	VSB E3 1–3	Krauss	1870	3	—	45		1909–1912	
E 3/3	8398, 8399	SCB 1–2	SCB	1876	2	—	40		1903–1904	
E 3/3	8401–8425	SCB F3 5–13, 41–46, 71–80	SLM	1896–1901	25	1	45		1936–1945	Nickname «Tigerli»
E 3/3	8431–8440	JS F3 857–866	SLM 1396–1405	1901	10	—	45 or 50		1941–1947	Nickname «Tigerli»
E 3/3	8451–8533		SLM	1902–1915	83	21	45 or 50		1946–1966	Nickname «Tigerli»
E 3/3	8561	GB 13	SLM	1875	1	—	40		1913	
E 3/3	8551–8559	NOB F3 452–461	SLM	1894–1896	9	2	40		1930–1938	
E 3/3	8571–8576	JS F3 851–856	SLM	1875, 1890	6	2	40 or 45		1911–1916	
E 3/3	8581–8589	SCB F3 81–90	SLM	1873–1874	9	—	40		1906–1917	
E 3/3	8651	KLB 1	Maffei 2983	1909	1	1	35			
E 3/3	8652	KLB 2	SLM	1897	1	—	45		1933	
E 3/3	8661, 8662	NOB 451, 452	MFE 1519–1521	1876	2	—	35		1935, 1938	
Ed 3/5	8799	JN 144–145	MFE 1303–1304	1873	2	—	40		1914	Engerth locomotive
E 4/4	8801–8802		SLM	1914	2	—	60		1964–1965	
E 4/4	8851–8856		SLM	1914–1915	6	—	60		1961–1965	
E 4/4	8901–8917		SLM	1930–1933	17	—	45		1957–1968	
G 3/3	101–110	JS 901–910	SLM	1887–1901	10	1	45		1911–1942	Brünigbahn metre gauge
G 3/4	201–208		SLM 1674–75, 2222–24, 2401–03	1905, 1912, 1913	8	1	45	243	1943–65	Brünigbahn metre-gauge
G 3/4	215–218	RhB 15, 16, 9, 10	SLM 1910–11, 1369-70	1908, 1901	4	—	55	226	1943–65	Brünigbahn metre-gauge; acquired 1924/26
HG 2/2	1001–1013	JS 951–963	SLM	1887–1901	13	—			1908–1912	Brünig^{7} metre-gauge
HG 3/3	1051–1068		SLM	1905–1926	18	2	45 (adh) 16 (rack)	294	1941–1965	Brünig^{7} metre-gauge

== Steam railcars ==
Steam railcars
Class (original)		Class (UIC)		Years Constructed	Quantity delivered	Quantity in service	Maximum speed (km/h)	Power (kW)	Withdrawn from service	Comments
Type	Numbers	Type	Numbers	Years Constructed	Quantity delivered	Quantity in service	Maximum speed (km/h)	Power (kW)	Withdrawn from service	Comments
CZm 1/2	1			1902	1	1	45		1907	Formerly UeBB, today DVZO

== Electric locomotives ==
Electric locomotives
Class (original)		Class (UIC)		Years Constructed	Quantity delivered	Quantity in service	Maximum speed (km/h)	Power (kW)	Withdrawn from service	Comments
Type	Numbers	Type	Numbers	Years Constructed	Quantity delivered	Quantity in service	Maximum speed (km/h)	Power (kW)	Withdrawn from service	Comments
Ae 4/8	11300			1922	1	0	90	1900	1964	Experimental locomotive «Bastard»
Be 2/5	11001			1918	1	0	75	736	1937	Experimental locomotive «MIDI-Locomotive»
Be 3/5	12201			1919	1	0	75	1177	1963	Experimental locomotive «Slow Berta»
Be 4/6	12301			1919	1	0	75	1570	1963	Experimental locomotive «Doryphore»
Be 4/6	12302			1919	1	0	75	1415	1965	Experimental locomotive
Ce 4/4	13501-13502			1905	2	2	60	257	1968	Experimental locomotives «Eva» and «Marianne»
Ce 6/6	14101			1912	1	0	60	1104	1937	Experimental locomotive «Röthenbachsäge»
Ce 6/8^{I}	14201			1920	1	1	65	1750	1982	Experimental locomotive «Schlotterbeck»
Ae 3/5	10201-10226			1922-1925	26	1	90	1350	1967-1983	Some rebuilt for piggyback service
Ae 3/6^{I}	10601-10714			1921-1929	114	4	90-110^{4}	1600	1970-1994	Longest use period
Ae 3/6^{II}	10401-10460			1924-1926	60	1	100	1500	1965-1977	
Ae 3/6^{III}	10261-10271			1925-1926	11	1	90	1350	1965-1980	
Ae 4/6	10801-10812			1941-1945	12	0	125	4100	1965-1983	
Ae 4/7	10901-11027	Ae 497^{5}	901-027	1927-1934	127	> 10	100	2300	-1997	
Ae 6/6	11401-11520	Ae 610^{5}		1952-1966	120	?	125	4300	from 2001	
Ae 8/14	11801, 51, 52			1931-1940	3	2	100-110^{4}	5200-8170^{4}	from 1972	3 different types
Be 4/4	12001			1927	1	0	75	900	1981	Inverter locomotive
Be 4/6	12303-12342			1920-1923	40	2	75	1295-1760^{4}	1965-1976	
Be 4/7	12501-12506			1929	6	1	80	1800	1966-1976	
Fc 2×3/3	14101	—	—	1912	1	—	60	1104	1937	«Röthenbachsäge»
Ce 6/8 ^{I}	14201	—	—	1920	1	—	65	1750	1982	«Schlotterbeck»
Ce 6/8^{II}^{1}	14251–14285 ^{2} ^{3}			1921-1922	33	7	65/75^{4}	1650	1968-1986	«Crocodile»
Ce 6/8^{III}^{1}	14301–14318 ^{2}			1926-1927	18	2	65/75^{4}	1800	1967-1977	«Crocodile»
De 6/6	15301–15303			1926	3	1	50	850	1983	«Seetal-Crocodile»
Re 4/4^{I}	10001–10050 ^{2}	Re 410^{5}		1946–1951	50	0	125	1850	1997	Some sold to Classic Rail^{8}
Re 4/4^{II}	11101–11349	Re 420	101–349	1964–1983	249+1	234	140	4700	2007–	12 units sold to BLS
Re 4/4^{II}	11350–11397 ^{3}	Re 421	371–397	1984–1985	27	26	140	4700		
Re 4/4^{III}	11350–11370	Re 430	350–370	1968, 1971	1+20	21	125	4700		Some in use at SOB
Re 4/4^{IV}	10101–10104	Re 440^{5}		1982	4	0	160	4960	1995–1996	Sold to SOB (SOB Re 446)
Re 4/4^{V}	10501–10523 ^{5}	Re 450	000–114	1989–1997	115	115	130	3200		Power head of the Zürich S-Bahn double-decker trains
Re 4/4^{VI}	10701–10712 ^{5}	Re 460	000–118	1991–1997	119	119	230	6100		IC2000
		Re 465^{9}	009–018	1994–1997	10	10	230	6100		IC2000; Leased to BLS^{9}
		Re 474	001–018^{3}	2004–2005	12	12	140	6400		Two system locomotive DC/AC
		Re 481	001–006	2000	6	0	140	5600	2005	Sold to MRCE
		Re 482	000–049	2002–	(50)		140	5600		Traxx F140 AC
		Re 484	001–021	2004–2006	21		140	5600		Traxx F140 MS
		Re 494	001-014	Since 2024	0 / 14	0 / 14	160	7000		Replaces the Re 420, 93 in option.
		Rea 494	201-222		0 / 22	0 / 22	160	7000 (2000 on battery)		Replaces the Re 420, 93 in option.
Re 6/6	11601–11689	Re 620	001–089	1972–1980	89	88	140	7900		
HGe 4/4^{I}	1991–1992	HGe 100^{5}	000–001	1954	2	0	50/33			Brünig^{7}
HGe 4/4^{II}	1951–1952			1986	2	0	100/40		1990 an FO	Brünig^{7}
HGe 4/4^{II}	1961–1968^{5}	HGe 101	961–968	1989–1990	8	8	100/40			Brünig^{7}

== Electric trainsets ==
Electric multiple units and trainsets
Class (original)		Class (UIC)		Years Constructed	Quantity delivered	Quantity in service	Maximum speed (km/h)	Continuous power (kW)	Withdrawn from service	Comments
Type	Numbers	Type	Numbers	Years Constructed	Quantity delivered	Quantity in service	Maximum speed (km/h)	Continuous power (kW)	Withdrawn from service	Comments
Bem 4/6^{5}	1350-1354^{5}	Bem 550	000-004	1994	5	0			2014	Direct current Rhône Express Regional Geneva-La Plaine
RAe 4/8	1021^{25}	RAe 506	605	1939	1	1	150	835	1978	«Churchill-Pfeil»
RAe TEE^{II}	1051-1055	RABe 506^{5}		1961-1966	5	1	160	2'310	1995-2000	For TEE service; rebuilt 1988-89 to RABe EC
Stadler SMILE		RABe 501	001-041	2017-	41	41	250	4'720		Called "Giruno", used on Gotthard routes to Italy. 41 orders, plus 80 options
Alstom New Pendolino		RABe 503	011-022	2012-2017	12	12	250	5'500		Called "Astoro", used for international routes to Italy and Germany. Also called "Cisalpino Due".
Stadler KISS	511 001 - 511 069; 511 101 - 511 124	RABe 511	001-069 (6-car, SBB); 101-124 (4-car, ZVV)	2008-2018	93	93	160	4'000		Modernisation ongoing.
Stadler KISS	512 001 to 512 060	RABe 512	001-060	2022-2026	60	60	160	4'000		In service since 2023
Siemens Desiro HC					0	0	160			116 ordered to enter service in 2031-2037 (86 option), Zurich S-Bahn, RER Vaud and Leman Express
Siemens Desiro Double Deck		RABe 514	001-060	2006-2009	60	60	140	3'200		Siemens Desiro, Zürich S-Bahn
Stadler GTW		RABe 520	000-016	2002	17	17	115	760		GTW 2/8
Stadler GTW		RABe 526	?	2002-	90	90	?	760		Stadler GTW part of SBB's division THURBO
Stadler GTW					0	0	125			11 ordered for the Seetaler, to enter service in 2029
Stadler FLIRT		RABe 521	001-030 201-209	2005-2007	39	39	160	2'000		«Mouette», can run on DB
Stadler FLIRT		RABe 522	201-232	2007-2019	32	32	160	2'000		«Mouette», can run on SNCF 25 kV AC
Stadler FLIRT		RABe 523	001-073; 101-114; 501-511	2004-2022	98	98	160	2'000		«Mouette», Swiss only
Stadler FLIRT		RABe 524	001-019; 101-117; 201-204; 301-314	2007-2022	54	54	160	2'000		«Mouette», can run on FS
Stadler FLIRT Evo		RABe 531 (3-car)		2026-			160	2'000		88 ordered by Thurboin the 531 variant
Stadler FLIRT Evo		RABe 533 (4-car)		2026-			160	2'000		19 ordered for Thurbo in the 533 variant, 27 for RegionAlps (24 ordered initially + 3 options exercised)
Stadler FLIRT Evo		RABe 533 (4-car)		2028-			160	2'000		198 ordered for the SBB (Domino gen 1 replacement)
Bombardier TWINDEXX - IC200	RABDe 502 001-023	SBB RABDe 502	502 001 - 502 023	2012-2020	23	23	200	6,060		Called “LD Double Decker” or «FV-Dosto», used on IC routes. Options for 100 additional sets.
Bombardier TWINDEXX - IR200	RABe 502 201-230	SBB RABe 502	502 201 - 502 230	2012-2020	30	30	200	6,060		Called “LD Double Decker” or «FV-Dosto», used on IC routes. Options for 100 additional sets.
Bombardier TWINDEXX - IR100	RABe 502 401-409	SBB RABe 502	502 401 - 502 409	2012-2020	9	9	200	3,030		Called “LD Double Decker” or «FV-Dosto», used on IC routes. Options for 100 additional sets.
ICN		RABDe 500	000-043	1999-2005	44	44	200	5'200		InterCity tilting train (ICN), used mainly on Jura routes, and to Ticino.
RABDe 12/12	1101-1120^{5}	RABDe 510	000-017	1965-1967	20	18	125	2'444		«Mirage», «Goldküstenexpress»
RABDe 8/16	2001-2004	RABDe 511^{5}	000-003	1976	4	0	125	2'250	1997	«Chiquita»
TGV	112, 114	TGV 500 (TGV PSE)	112, 114		2	2	300^{6}			
TGV	4406	TGV 4400 (TGV POS)	4406	2006	1	1	320	9'280		Trainset in question named «Basel»

== Electric railcars ==
Electric railcars
Class (original)		Class (UIC)		Years Constructed	Quantity delivered	Quantity in service	Maximum speed (km/h)	Power (kW)	Withdrawn from service	Comments
Type	Numbers	Type	Numbers	Years Constructed	Quantity delivered	Quantity in service	Maximum speed (km/h)	Power (kW)	Withdrawn from service	Comments
Be 4/6	1601-1619			1923-1927	19	0			1991-1994	
De 4/4^{1}	1661-1684^{2}			1927-1928	24	1	85	806	1987	Rebuilt from Fe 4/4 18501-18524
RAe 2/4	1001-1002			1935-1936	2	1				Nickname «Roter Pfeil» («Red Arrow»)
RBe 4/4	1401-1482	RBe 540	000-079	1959-1966	82	74	125	1988	from 2003	
RBDe 4/4	2100-2184^{5}	RBDe 560, 561, 562	000-135^{3}	1984-1996	126	126	140	1650		NPZ
BDe 4/4	1621-1651	BDe 570^{5}		1953-1955	31	0			1994-1997	
BDe 4/4^{II}	1301-1302^{2}	BDe 571^{5}		1956-1957	2	0	110	1090	1995	Direct current
De 4/4^{II}		De 110	000-005	(1992-1993)						Brünig^{7}, Rebuilt from Deh 4/6
Deh 4/6	901-916	Deh 120	006-012	1941-1942	16	2	75/33			Brünig ^{7}

== Diesel locomotives ==
Diesel locomotives (excluding shunters)
Class (original)		Class (UIC)		Years Constructed	Quantity delivered	Quantity in service	Maximum speed (km/h)	Power (kW)	Withdrawn from service	Comments
Type	Numbers	Type	Numbers	Years Constructed	Quantity delivered	Quantity in service	Maximum speed (km/h)	Power (kW)	Withdrawn from service	Comments
Am 4/6	1101			1938	1	0	110	1620	1958	Gas turbine-electric locomotive
Am 4/4	18461–18467	Am 841^{5}	000–006	1954	7	0	140	2200	1997	Former DB V 200
Bm 4/4	18401–18446	Bm 840^{5}	000–045	1960–1970	46		75	620		
Bm 4/4^{II}	18451–18452			1939/1963	2	0	75		1990	Rebuilt Am 4/4
		Am 840	001–003; 901–903	2003	6	6	120			MaK/Vossloh G2000
		Am 841	000–039	1996–1997	40		80			
Am 4/4^{5}		Am 842	000–001	1991–1992	2		80			MaK G 1204 BB; Sersa
		Am 842.1	101–102	2003	2	2	100			Vossloh G1000 BB
		Am 843	001–095^{3}	2003–2005	73		100	1500		Vossloh G1700 BB
Bm 6/6	18501–18514	Bm 860		1955–1961	14		75			
Am 6/6	18521–18526	Am 861		1976	6		85			

== Diesel trainsets ==
Diesel railcars, multiple units and trainsets
Class (original)		Class (UIC)		Years Constructed	Quantity delivered	Quantity in service	Maximum speed (km/h)	Power (kW)	Withdrawn from service	Comments
Type	Numbers	Type	Numbers	Years Constructed	Quantity delivered	Quantity in service	Maximum speed (km/h)	Power (kW)	Withdrawn from service	Comments
RAm TEE I	501–502	—	—	1957	2	—	140	1480	1977	For TEE service, NS had three more (1001–1003). One written off in 1971, remaining 4 sold to Ontario Northland Railway, Canada in 1979

== Battery-electric railcars ==
Battery-electric railcars
Class (original)		Class (UIC)		Years Constructed	Quantity delivered	Quantity in service	Maximum speed (km/h)	Power (kW)	Withdrawn from service	Comments
Type	Numbers	Type	Numbers	Years Constructed	Quantity delivered	Quantity in service	Maximum speed (km/h)	Power (kW)	Withdrawn from service	Comments
Ee 2/2	1–5 (from 1920 Xa 2/2; from 1923 Ta 2/2)			1919	5	0			1936–ca. 1956	reclassified as light shunters from 1923

== Shunters ==
=== Heavy shunters ===
Heavy shunters
Class (original)		Class (UIC)		Years Constructed	Quantity delivered	Quantity in service	Maximum speed (km/h)	Power (kW)	Withdrawn from service	Comments
Type	Numbers	Type	Numbers	Years Constructed	Quantity delivered	Quantity in service	Maximum speed (km/h)	Power (kW)	Withdrawn from service	Comments
Ee 2/2										
		Ee 922	001-021	2009-2010	21	15	100	612		New electric shunters from Stadler, two-system
		Eem 923	001-030	2011-2012	30	30	120	290 / 1,500		Electro-diesel
Ee 3/4	16301-16302			1922						
Ee 3/3	16311-16460 (with gaps)	Ee 930		1923-1966	136		40-50^{4}	428-508^{4}	199?-	
Ee 3/3^{II}	16501-16506	Ee 931^{5}	000-005	1957-1958	6	2	45	525	currently	Two system, pre-series
Ee 3/3^{II}	16511-16519	Ee 932^{5}	000-008	1962-1963	9	9	45	525		Two system, bought 1971-72 from SNCF
Ee 3/3^{IV}	16551-16560	Ee 934^{5}	551-560	1962-1963	10	10	60	390		Four system
Ee 6/6	16801-16802	Ee 960	000-001	1952	2					
Ee 6/6^{II}	16811-16820	Ee 961	000-009	1980	10					
Eem 6/6	17001-17006	Eem 962		1970	6					Rebuilt to Em 6/6
Em 3/3	18801-18841	Em 830	000-040		41					
		Em 831		1992-						
Em 6/6		Em 862	000-004		5					

=== Light shunters ===
Light shunters
Class (original)		Class (UIC)		Years Constructed	Quantity delivered	Quantity in service	Maximum speed (km/h)	Power (kW)	Withdrawn from service	Comments
Type	Numbers	Type	Numbers	Years Constructed	Quantity delivered	Quantity in service	Maximum speed (km/h)	Power (kW)	Withdrawn from service	Comments
Ta	966, 968-976	Ta 200/201	001-005; 010-012; 020-025							
Te^{I}	1-60	Te 210	000-059		60					
Te^{II}	61-97	Te 211	000-036		37					
Te^{III}	121-138	Te 212			18					
Te^{IV}	8201-8203	Te 214	000-002		3					
Tem^{I}	251-275	Tem 220			25					
Tem^{II}	276-298	Tem 221	000-022		22					
Tem^{III}	321-365	Tem 222			45					
Tm	401-403	Tm 230	001-003		18					
Tm^{I}	407-503	Tm 230.4								
Tm^{II}	601-853	Tm 230.6								
Tm^{III}	901-924; 9451-9463; 9501-9597	Tm 231	000-023; 100-112; 200-296	1976-1988	134					
Tm^{IV}	8751-8796; 9651-9685	Tm 232.1/232.2	100-145; 200-234							
		Tm 230								
		Tm 232								Modernised version of Tm^{III}
		Tm 234	000-149		50			550		Construction shunter «Ameise»
		Tm 235								Construction shunter «Robel»

== Notes ==
^{1} Designations have changed over time
^{2} Numbers have changed over time
^{3} Numbers not continuous
^{4} Changes within one series
^{5} Not used any more, not yet used, or defined, but never used
^{6} Details have changed over time, this is the latest information
^{7} Today Zentralbahn
^{8} Classic Rail sold four of these locomotives to MThB
^{9} These locomotives were bought by the SBB-CFF-FFS and leased to BLS Lötschbergbahn

== Gallery ==
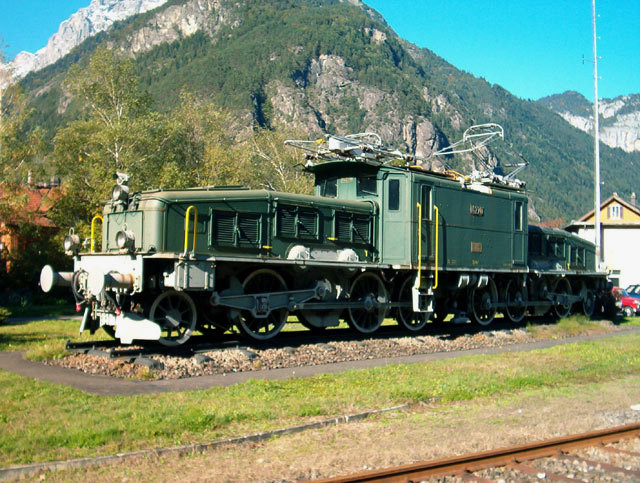
Ce 6/8^{II}

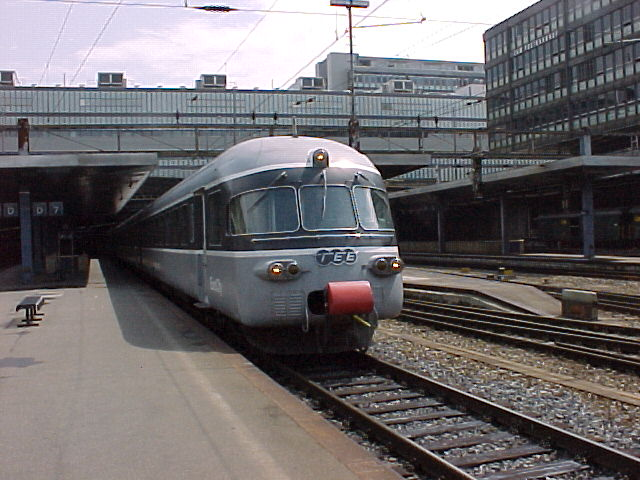
RABe EC

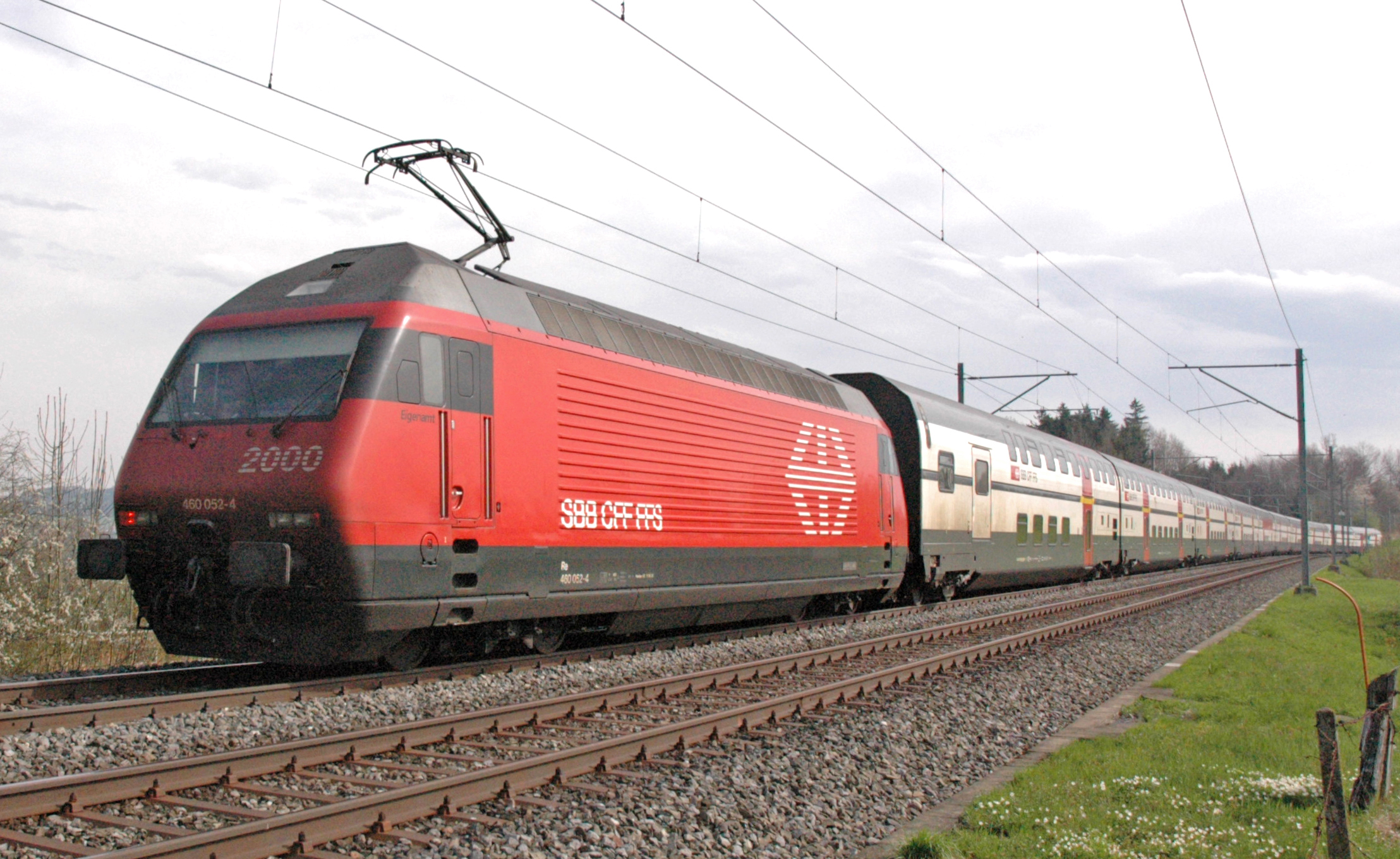
Re 460 052

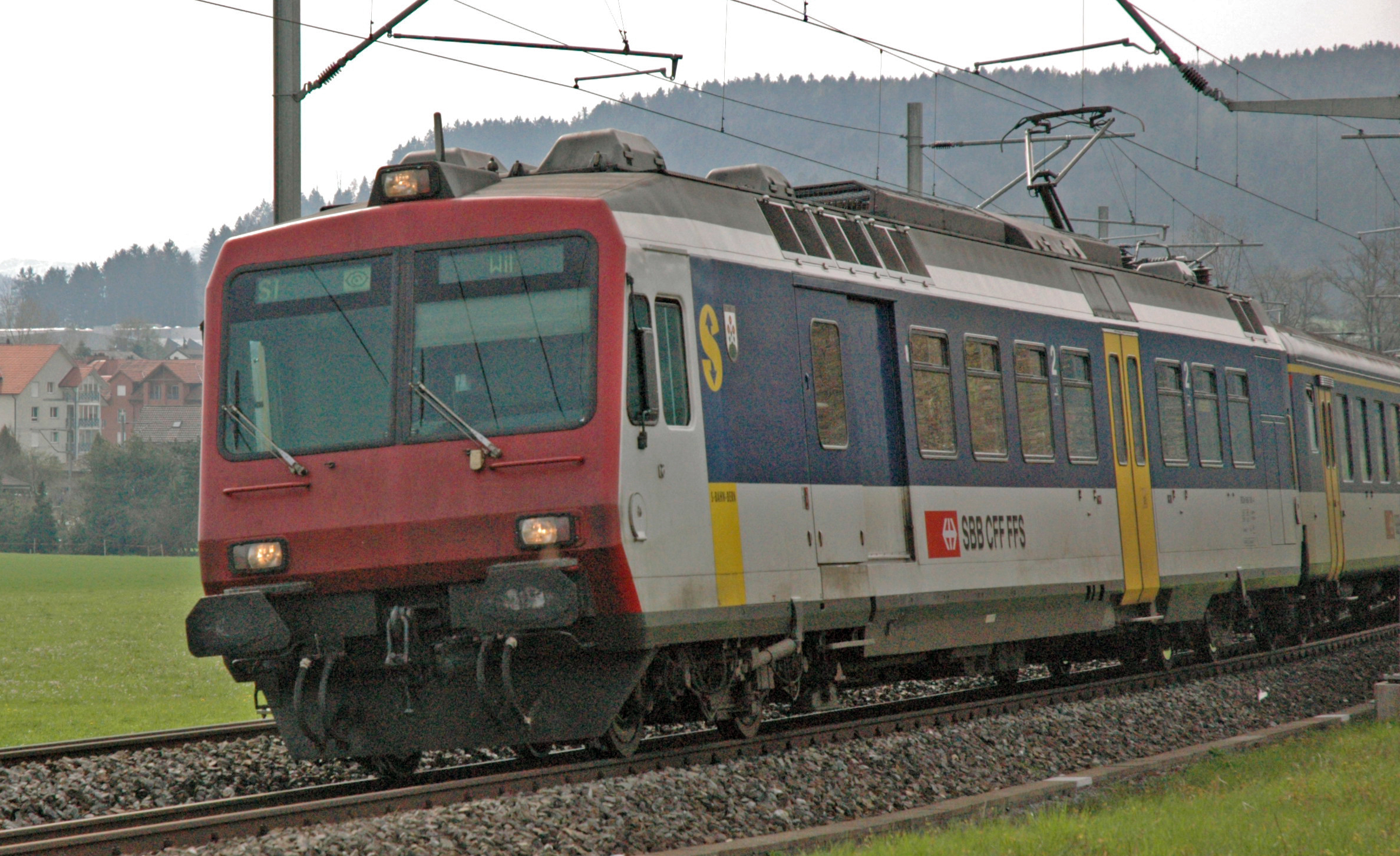
RBDe 560

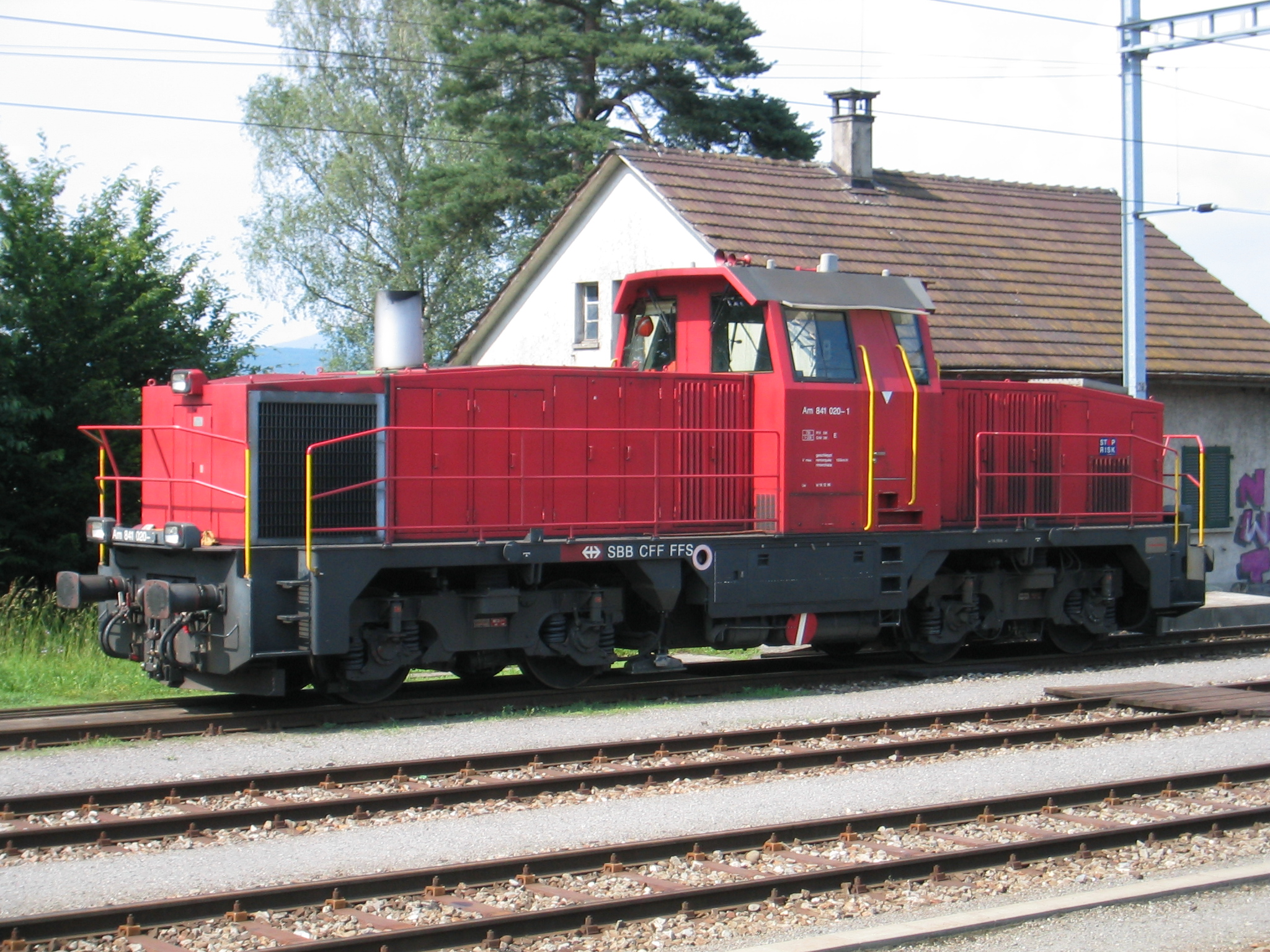
Am 841 000

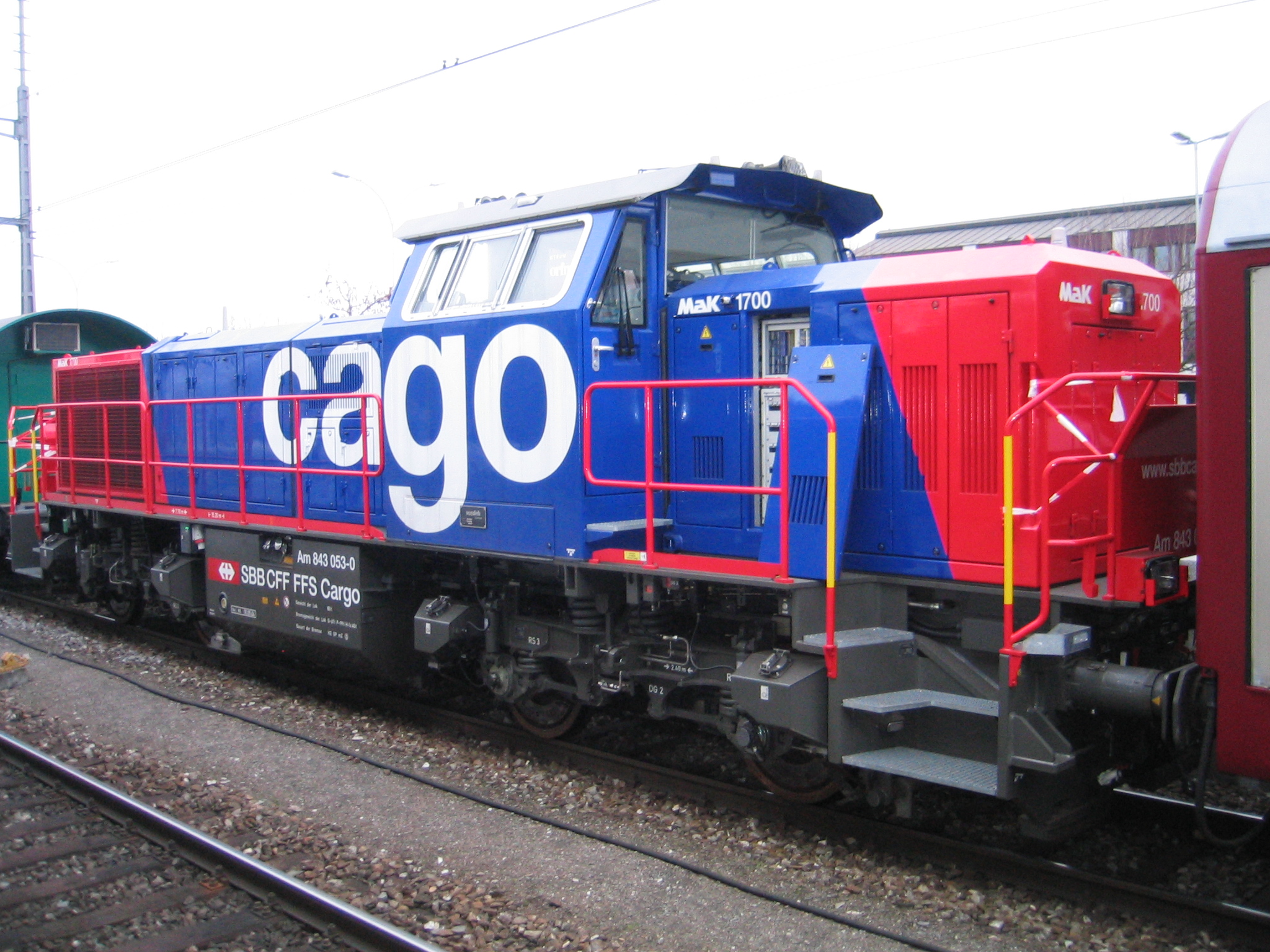
Am 843

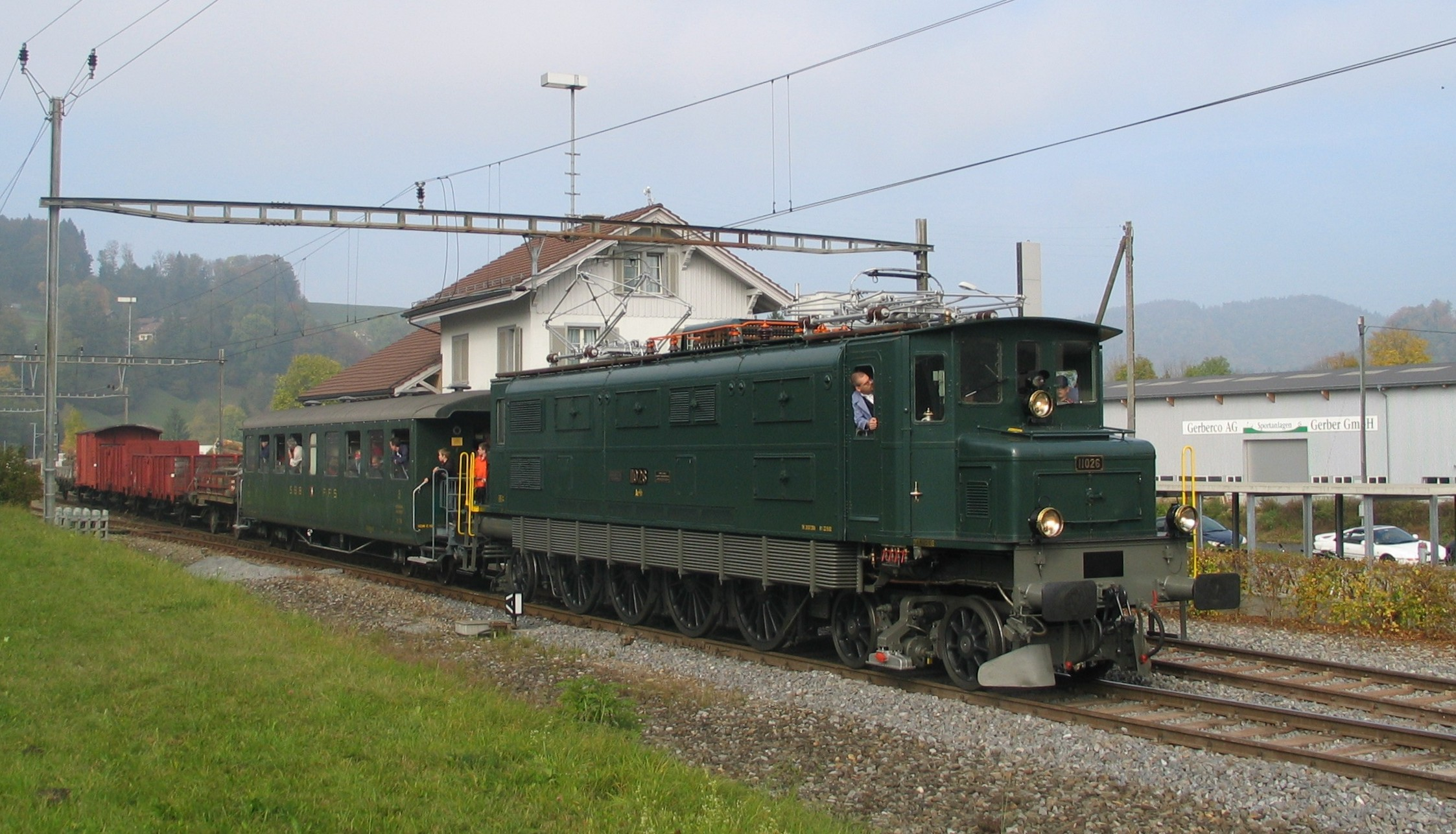
Ae 4/7

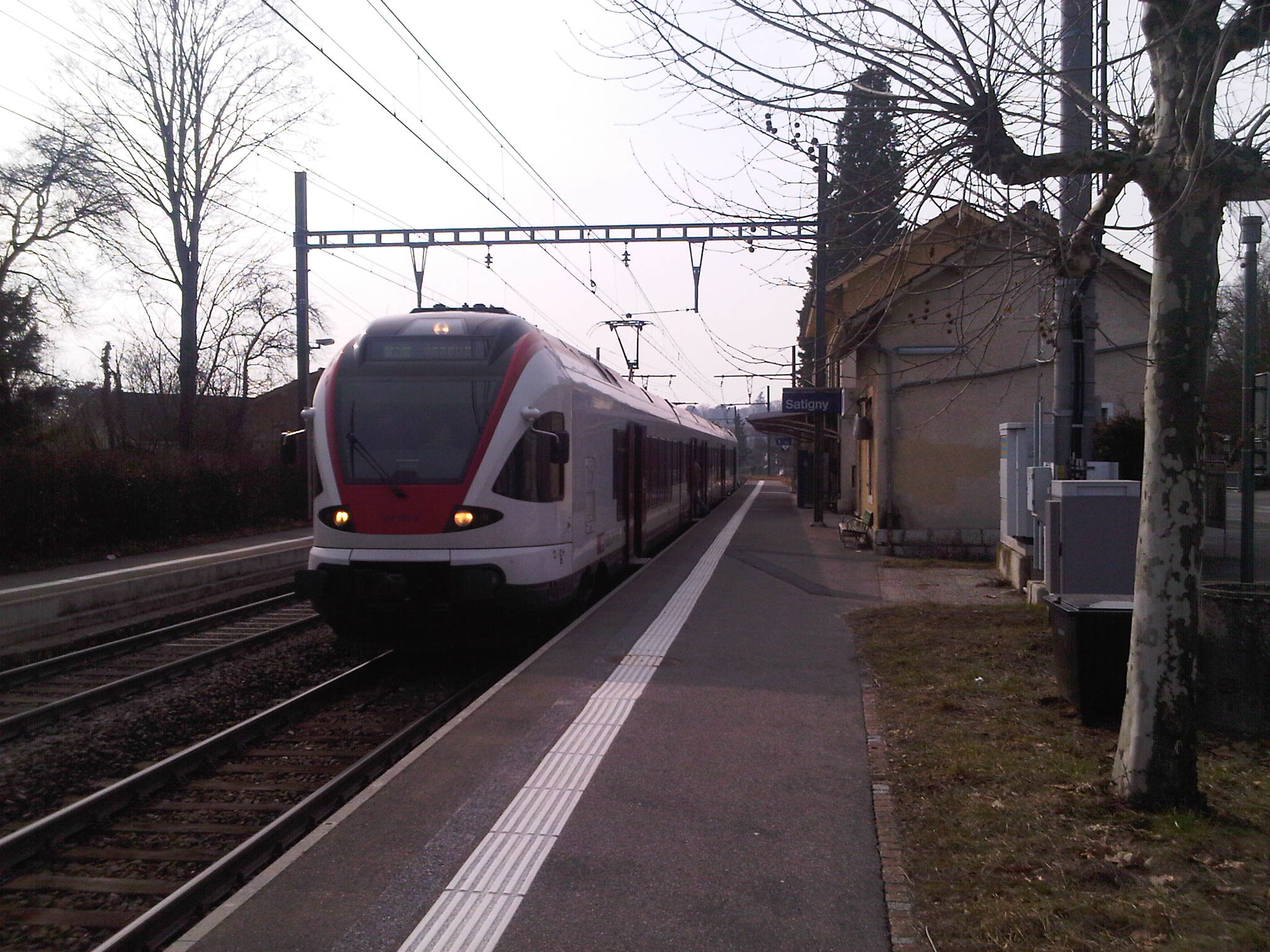
RABe 522

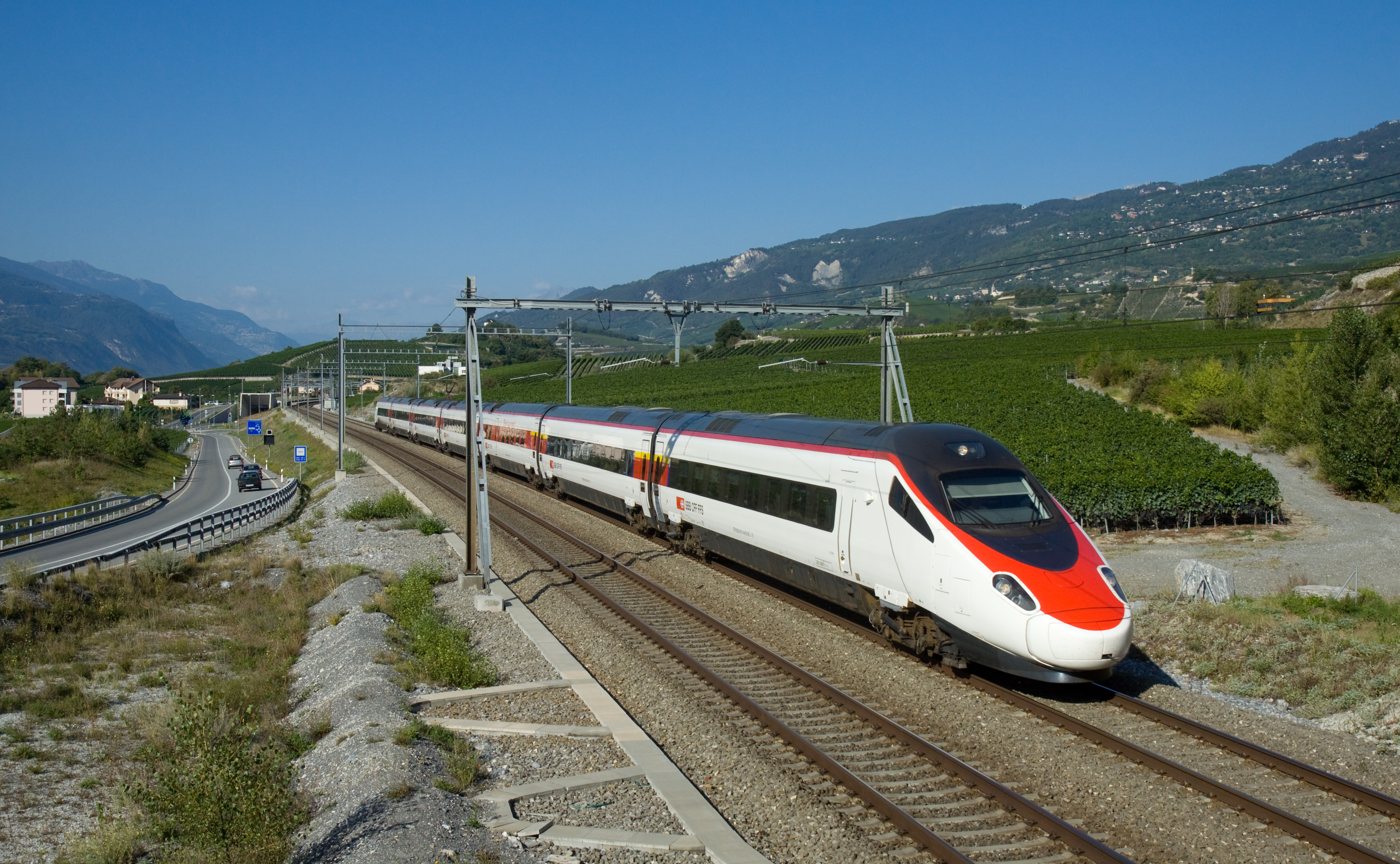
ETR 610

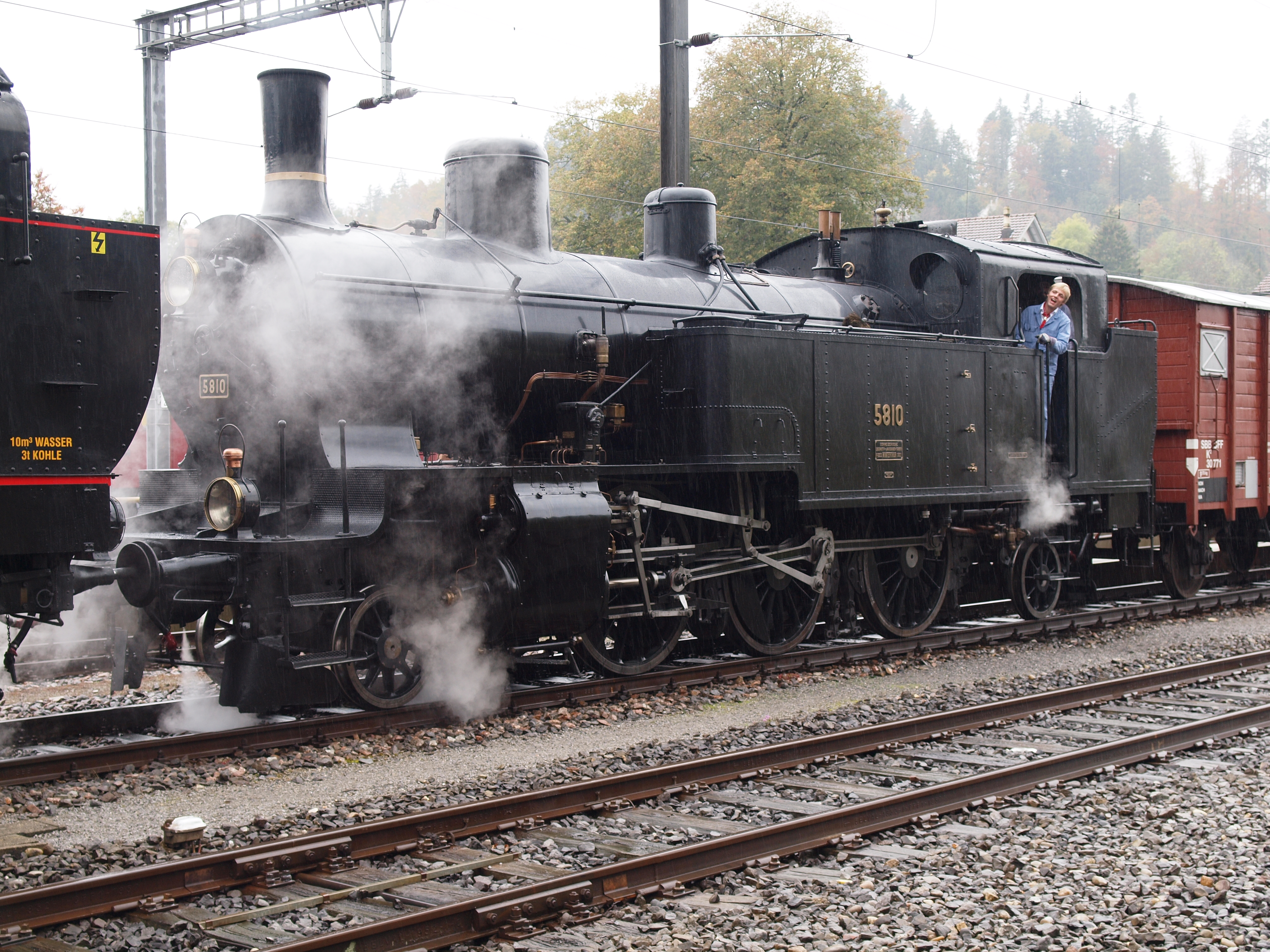
SBB Eb 3/5

== Sources, further reading ==
=== See also ===
- Swiss locomotive and railcar classification
