= SBB A 3/5 =

Swiss steam locomotive

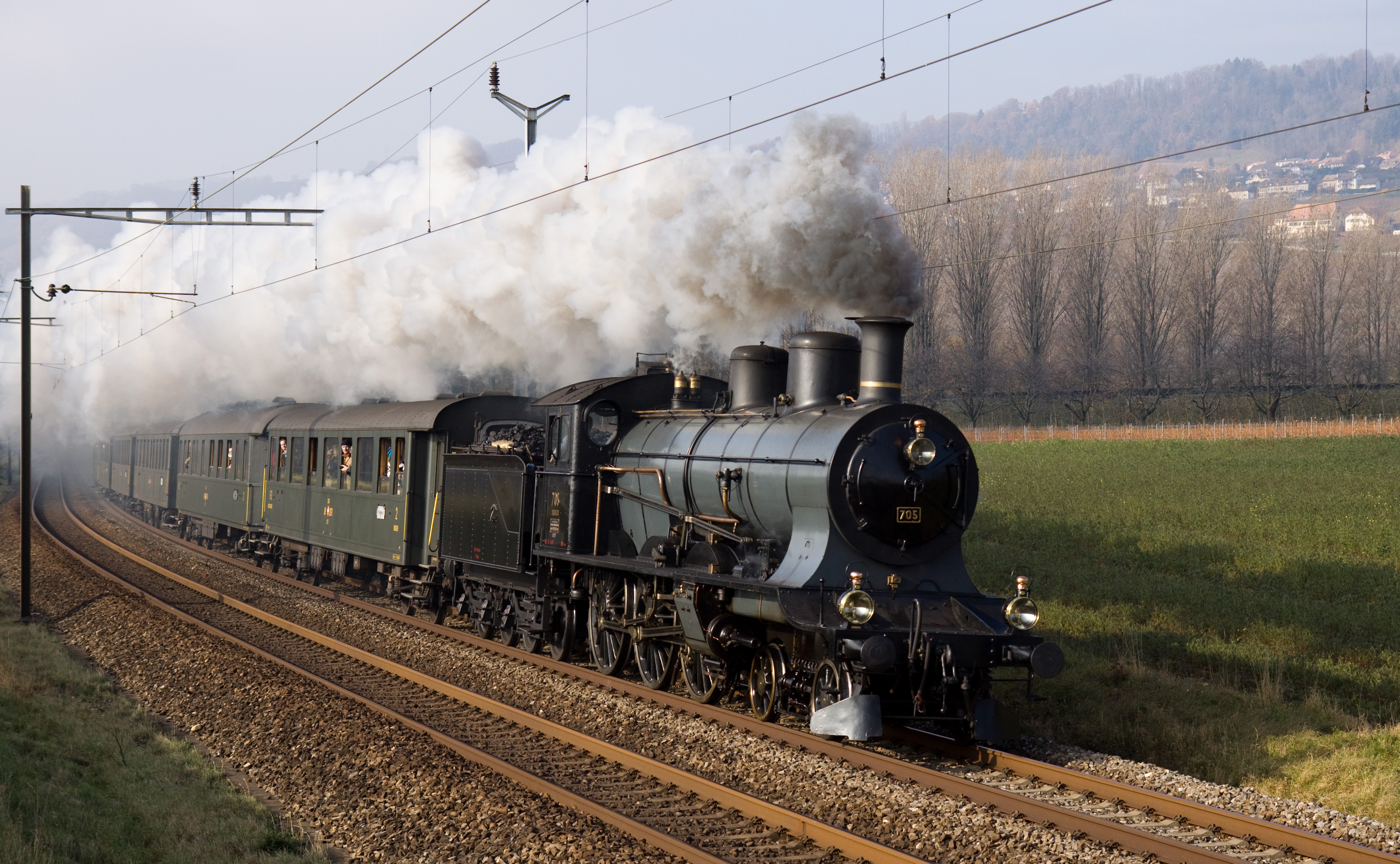
- SBB A 3/5 express locomotive with matching coaches near Rolle
Type and origin
- Power type: Steam
- Builder: SLM Winterthur
- Build date: 1902–1922
- Total produced: 111
Specifications
- Configuration
  - Whyte: 4-6-0
  - UIC: 2′C v4 2′C h4 (68 locomotives)
- Gauge: 1,435 mm (4 ft 8 1/2 in)
- Wheelbase
  - Engine: 701-702: 3,900 mm (12 ft 10 in); 703-809: 4,150 mm (13 ft 7 in)
  - incl. tender: 701-702: 8,100 mm (26 ft 7 in); 703-809: 8,350 mm (27 ft 5 in)
- Length: 18,600 mm (61 ft 0 in)
- Height: 4,400 mm (14 ft 5 in)
- Loco weight: 106–107 tonnes (104–105 long tons; 117–118 short tons)
- Fuel capacity: 4-axle tender: 8 t (7.9 long tons; 8.8 short tons); 3-axle tender: 7 t (6.9 long tons; 7.7 short tons)
- Water cap.: 4-axle tender: 17 m^{3} (600 cu ft); 3-axle tender: 17.8 m^{3} (630 cu ft)
- Firebox
  - Grate area: 701-702: 2.7 m^{2} (29 sq ft); 703-809: 2.6 m^{2} (28 sq ft)
- Heating surface
  - Tubes and flues: 4,200 mm (13 ft 9 in)
  - Total surface: 701-702: 168.8 m^{2} (1,817 sq ft); 703-748: 165.5 m^{2} (1,781 sq ft); 749-809: 157.7 m^{2} (1,697 sq ft)
- Superheater
  - Heating area: 21 elements: 37.6 m^{2} (405 sq ft); 24 elements: 46.2 m^{2} (497 sq ft)
- Cylinders: 4 – de Glehn compound
- High-pressure cylinder: 360 mm × 660 mm (14 in × 26 in)
- Low-pressure cylinder: 570 mm × 660 mm (22 in × 26 in)
- Valve gear: Walschaerts (outside); Joy (inside)
Performance figures
- Maximum speed: 100 km/h (62 mph)
- Power output: 1,000 kW (1,300 hp)
- Tractive effort
  - Starting: 75 kN (17,000 lbf)
Career
- Operators: JS, SBB
- Numbers: JS: 231+232; SBB: 701–811
- Withdrawn: 1926-1964
- Preserved: No. 705
- Disposition: One preserved, remainder scrapped

The Swiss Class A 3/5 locomotives were built between 1902 and 1922 for the Jura–Simplon Railway, and the Gotthard Railway. These railways were absorbed into Swiss Federal Railways in 1903. In total 111 4-6-0 locomotives of this type were built by Schweizerische Lokomotiv- und Maschinenfabrik in Winterthur, Switzerland.

== History ==
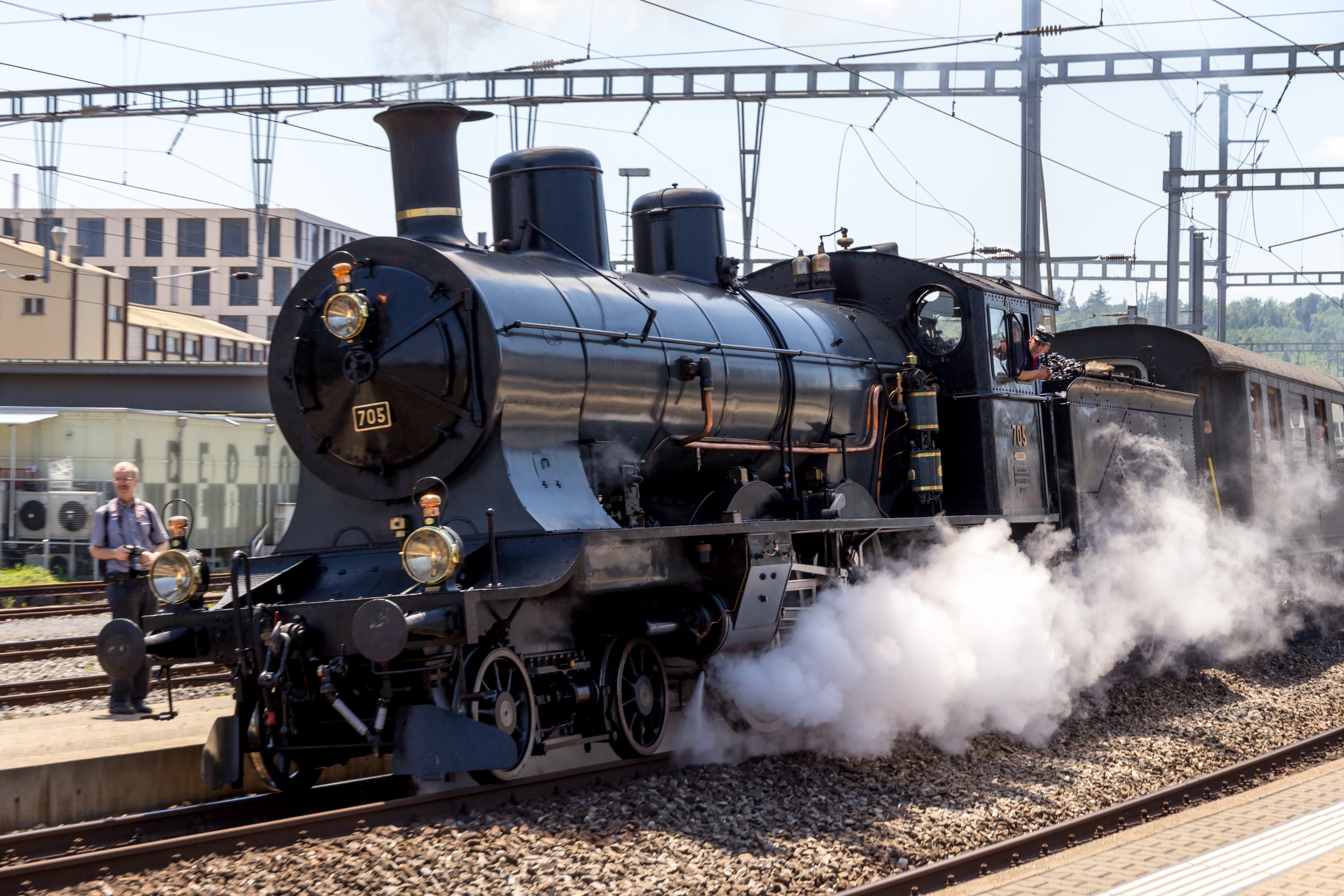
SBB A3/5 in Brugg

The Jura-Simplon Railway was looking for a powerful locomotive capable of hauling its increasingly heavy express trains. The A 2/4 class were unable to cope with the heavy loads, resulting in trains often being split up or double-headed, whereas the B 3/4, with its top speed being 75 km/h (47 mph), were too sluggish for express trains. This led to the creation of the A 3/5, by combining the four-wheel pilot bogie of the A 2/4, and the six-coupled driving wheelset of the B 3/4. The locomotives were designed to haul 300 ton trains on 10% gradients at 50 km/h, but the normal load could later be increased to 400 tons.

The A 3/5 was originally ordered by the Jura-Simplon Railway (JS), but only the first two locomotives were delivered before nationalization in 1903. Afterwards, the SBB ordered over a hundred more locomotives of similar design with minor modifications, ultimately rounding up to 111 members.

By the mid-1900s, the A 3/5, which were saturated locomotives, were technologically obsolete, prompting the SBB to order six experimental locomotives with advanced features in 1906. These were the following locomotives delivered in 1907:

- two three-cylinder superheated locomotives - A 3/5 501–502
- two four-cylinder superheated compound locomotives - A 3/5 601–602
- two four-cylinder saturated compound locomotives with Brotan boiler - A 3/5 651–652

In theory, the Brotan boiler locomotives cost less to maintain than conventional locomotives with copper fireboxes. These two locomotives, initially numbered 651-652, were redesignated as numbers 810 and 811 in 1913, before being scrapped in 1933.

All three variants inherited the wheelbase and wheel diameter from their JS ancestors. After extensive testing, the A 3/5 601-602 were adopted for serial production, with 47 more locomotives of this design being delivered, succeeding the JS locomotives in 1909. No.616 was exhibited at the Turin International in 1911.

In 1918, no.802 received a Knorr feedwater preheater with piston feed pump, while no.731 was used for experiments with oil and coal dust firing.

By the end of 1919, A 3/5s were assigned to four of the five SBB districts; only District V of Lucerne, which managed the routes of the former Gotthard Railway, did not have the JS A 3/5. District II of Basel was the home for most A 3/5 locomotives. Most of the locomotives would undergo heavy maintenance at Biel workshops, but repairs were also carried out at Zurich and Yverdon.

Distribution of locomotives, 1919
District	Administration	Main workshop	Running number	Quantity
I	Lausanne	Yverdon	701-706, 715-724, 739-742	20
II	Basel	Biel	707-714, 725-736, 760-761, 775-790, 799-809	49
III	Zurich	Zurich	737-738, 755-759, 762-772, 791-798	26
IV	St. Gallen	Biel	743–754, 773–774	14
Total quantity:				109

== Preservation ==
One locomotive, No.705 of 1904, has been preserved since being listed in 1964, and is under ownership by SBB Historic as of 2022. It has the boiler of no.739 fitted in 1953, and the underframes of no.778 in 1963.

== Design ==
The JS A 3/5, originally a 4-cylinder saturated compound design, were a further evolvement of the A 3/5 201–230 delivered to the Gotthard Railway Company in 1897, incorporating a slightly larger firebox, an increased driving wheel diameter of 1,780 mm (5 ft 10 in) and an increased piston stroke, resulting in a higher top speed of 100 km/h, compared to 90 km/h on the Gotthard Railway locomotives. Furthermore, the cylinder arrangement was rotated compared to the Gotthard machines, so that the high-pressure cylinders were arranged on the outside and the low-pressure cylinders on the inside. The locomotives rebuilt by the SBB had their wheelbase lengthened to 8,350 mm (27 ft 5 in) compared to the first two locomotives and thus a larger heating surface. The adhesion weight was increased to 46 t.

The first 48 locomotives had four-axle bogie tenders, while the others had three-axle ones, which holds a larger water capacity, but could only carry 7 tons of coal.

== Models ==
Scale models of the A 3/5 have been produced in a number of scales, from the tiny 1:220 Z scale, up to 1:32 Gauge 1.

== See also ==
- List of stock used by Swiss Federal Railways
