= SBB RABDe 8/16 =

Swiss commuter train

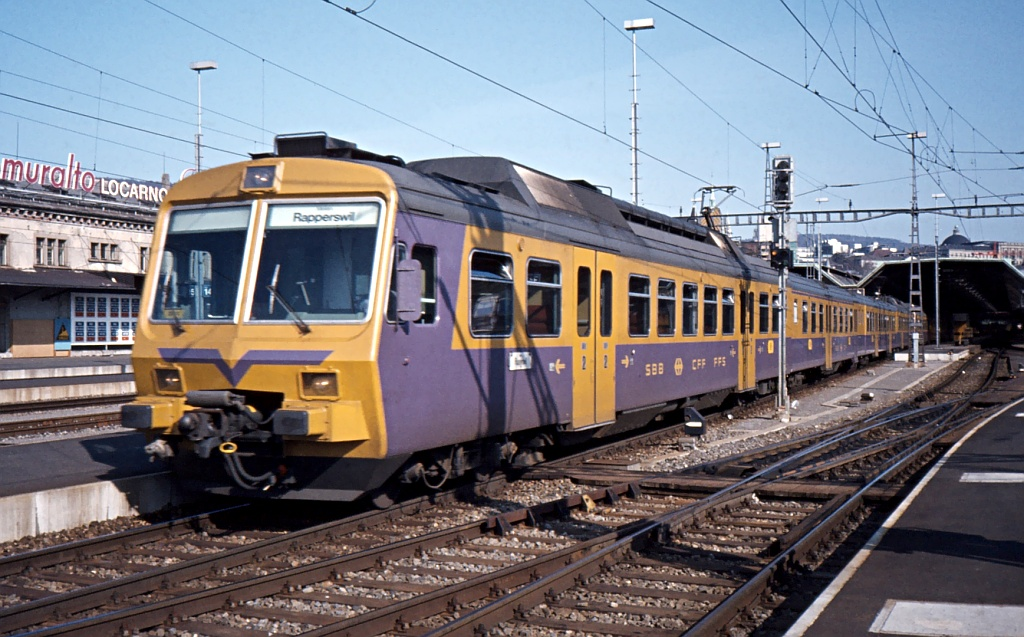
- SBB RABDe 8/16 in its original livery
Type and origin
- Power type: Electric
- Builder: SWS Schlieren; SIG Neuhausen am Rheinfall; SAAS Geneva; Schindler Waggon Pratteln
- Build date: 1976
- Total produced: 4
Specifications
- Configuration
  - UIC: Bo'Bo'+2'2'+2'2'+Bo'Bo'
- Gauge: 1,435 mm (4 ft 8 1/2 in)
- Length: 100,000 mm (328 ft 1.0 in)
- Loco weight: 149 t (147 long tons; 164 short tons)
Performance figures
- Maximum speed: 125 km/h (78 mph)
- Power output: 2,250 kW (3,020 hp) at 81 km/h (50 mph)
- Tractive effort: 100 kN (22,000 lb_{f}) (continuous); 187 kN (42,000 lb_{f}) (maximum)
Career
- Numbers: 2001 – 2004
- Last run: September 30, 1997
- Retired: 1997
- Preserved: 0
- Scrapped: 1998

The RABDe 8/16 are a consequential further development of the RABDe 12/12 multiple units used by the Swiss Federal Railways. They were, like the RABDe 12/12, designed for quick acceleration in commuter traffic. But in contrast to the RABDe 12/12, they didn't reach this goal with a lot of motor power, but rather by having a lightweight aluminium construction. Four ordered prototypes were built, but already retired from service in 1997 and later scrapped. They are among the SBB vehicles with the shortest use period.

The trainsets originally had the numbers 1121–1124. Already during construction of the prototypes, the waggon floor bent "like a banana" - One of the reasons why they got the nickname "Chiquita". Another reason was their unique purple-yellow livery, captivating many railfans.

Starting 1976, the Chiquitas were used on the right-hand waterside of the Lake of Zurich. Due to massive problems mainly with the door controllers, which didn't work correctly because of the flexing floors, they were later used mainly on spur lines in north-eastern Switzerland (Kreis III). Despite being rarely used due to the problems, two trainsets (2001 and 2003) were rebuilt in 1990 and 1991, respectively, and got, among other things, a new NPZ-like livery. In 1992, all four units were defective. Instead of undergoing another revision, they were put on sidings in Glarus and were not used any more. In 1993, a single trainset was rented to the Mittelthurgaubahn, whereupon the B car was removed. The AB car had to stay, because it contained some of the trainset's systems. All trainsets were retired from service in 1997 and finally scrapped in 1998.

== Construction and technology ==
To achieve the low weight of 149 tonnes for a trainset consisting of four cars, the cars were consistently built in a lightweight mode of construction, using aluminium wherever possible. Unfortunately, expertise in lightweight construction was rare at that time, which led to the aforementioned issues, which, in turn, were the reasons why they never made it into series production.

In terms of passenger convenience, the Chiquitas have set new standards, mainly thanks to the low floor and the amply, broad and right from the beginning automatic doors. The traction technology was also new, and featured small, lightweight direct current motors, which could be run stepless thanks to a thyristor controller, in contrast to the rough step controllers on the RABDe 12/12. The trailer bogies of the two middle cars where the same as those of the EW III.

One trainset had 54 seats in first and 224 seats in second class. The first class middle car also had a luggage compartment.

Marketing strategists wanted to give all commuter vehicles a similar appearance, which is why the newer NPZ as well as the Zürich S-Bahn double decker trains have a shape similar to the Chiquitas - it is actually a development of the Chiquita's front. The NPZ's doors are also very similar to those built into the Chiquitas.

== Operation ==
The four cars couldn't be separated in normal operation. Because there was no traction voltage cable running through the train, both power heads (front and back cars) were equipped with a pantograph. Both power heads had a driver's cab and automatic +GF+-couplers. The trainsets featured multiple unit train control, whereby technically all four units could have been run together (but platforms usually were too short). The couplers mechanically fit onto those of the RABDe 12/12.

== See also ==
- List of stock used by Swiss Federal Railways

== Sources ==
This article was mostly translated from the German language version of August 2006.
