= SBB De 6/6 =

Swiss electric locomotive

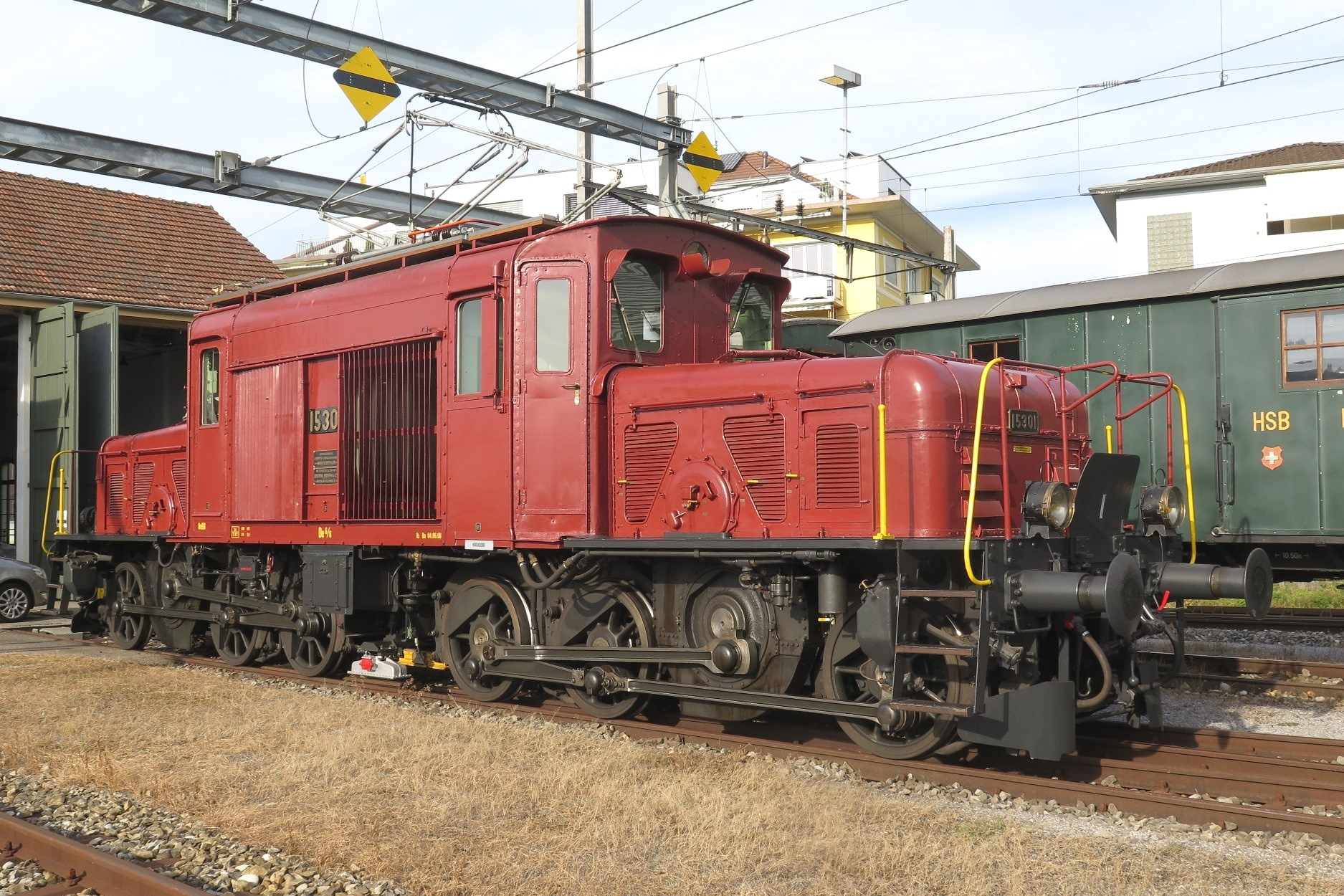
- De 6/6 15301 in Hochdorf
Type and origin
- Power type: Electric
- Builder: SLM BBC
- Build date: 1926
- Total produced: 3
Specifications
- Configuration
  - AAR: C-C
  - UIC: C′C′
- Gauge: 1,435 mm (4 ft 8 1/2 in)
- Wheelbase: 10,800 mm (35 ft 5 in) (first and last axle)
- Length: 14,000 mm (45 ft 11 in)
- Loco weight: 73 tonnes (71.8 long tons; 80.5 short tons)
- Electric system/s: 15 kV 16 2/3 Hz AC Catenary (also 5.5 kV 25 Hz AC catenary until 1930)
- Current pickup(s): Pantograph
- Traction motors: Two
Performance figures
- Maximum speed: 50 km/h (31 mph)
- Power output: 850 kW (1,140 hp)
Career
- Operators: Swiss Federal Railways
- Numbers: 15301–15303
- Nicknames: Seetal Crocodile
- Withdrawn: 1983
- Preserved: 1
- Current owner: Oensingen-Balsthal-Bahn

The Swiss Class De 6/6 electric locomotives were built in 1926 for the Swiss Federal Railways. Ordered for the Seetalbahn line, which runs between Lenzburg and Emmenbrücke, they were Known as Seetal Crocodiles. In total 3 locomotives of this type were built, and numbered 15301–15303. As built they were capable of operating under dual voltage - the 5.5 kV, 25 Hz AC system in use on the Seetal line, and the national 15 kV 16 2/3 Hz AC system. The former system was removed from these locomotives in 1930, when the line was modernised to SBB national standards.

== Disposal and preservation ==
All three locomotives were withdrawn by SBB in April 1983, with 15302 and 15303 being scrapped. 15301 was purchased by the Oensingen-Balsthal-Bahn.

== See also ==
- List of stock used by Swiss Federal Railways
