= SBB Bm 4/4 =

Swiss class of diesel shunting locomotives

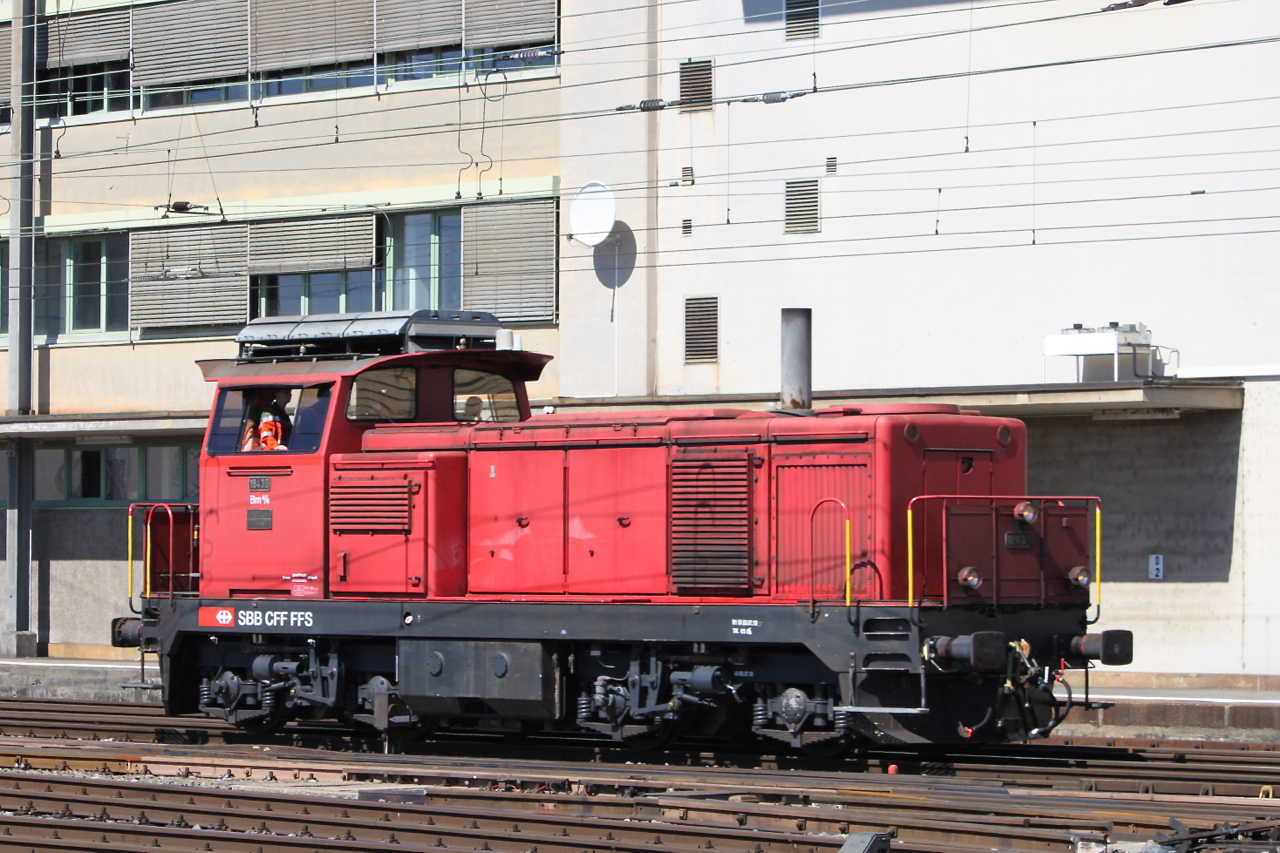
- Bm 4/4 18439 at Lausanne train station
Type and origin
- Power type: Diesel
- Builder: SLM, SAAS
- Build date: 1960–1970
- Total produced: 46
Specifications
- Configuration
  - AAR: B-B
  - UIC: Bo′Bo′
- Gauge: 1,435 mm (4 ft 8 1/2 in)
- Length: 12,650–13,710 mm (41 ft 6 in – 45 ft 0 in)
- Loco weight: 72 tonnes (70.9 long tons; 79.4 short tons)
- Traction motors: Four
- Transmission: Diesel electric
Performance figures
- Maximum speed: 75 km/h (47 mph)
- Power output: 620kw (840hp)
Career
- Operators: SBB-CFF-FFS
- Numbers: 18401–18446
- Withdrawn: From 2006

The Bm 4/4 is a class of heavy diesel shunting locomotives built by SLM for the Swiss Federal Railways. 46 examples were built between 1960 and 1970, numbered 18401 to 18446. Starting in 2006, the class was slowly being replaced by new Vossloh-built locomotives. The last SBB example was withdrawn in 2024 but a few are in use with private operators.

== See also ==
- List of stock used by Swiss Federal Railways
