= SBB Am 6/6 =

Swiss diesel shunting locomotive

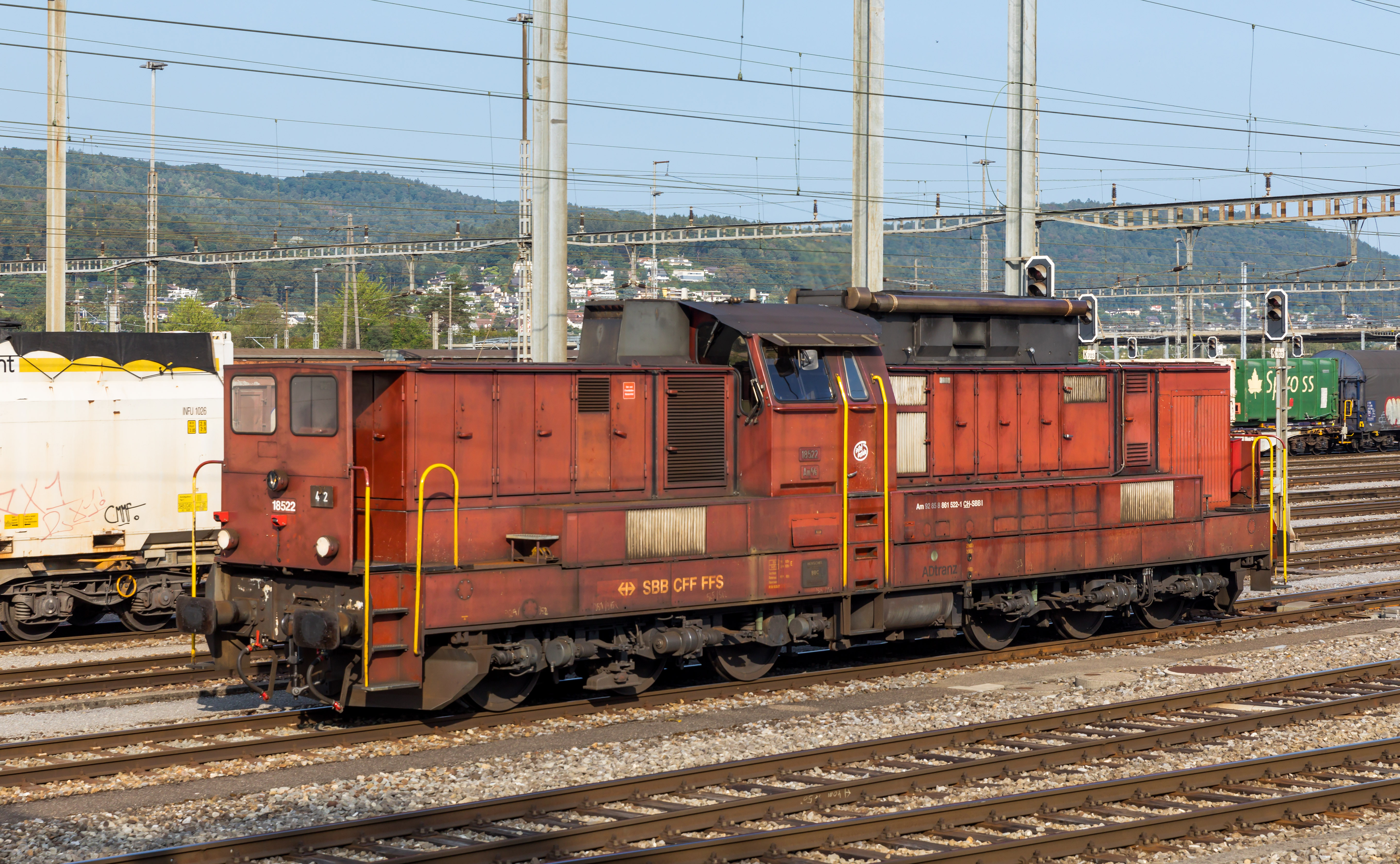
Type and origin
- Power type: Diesel
- Builder: Thyssen Henschel, Brown, Boveri & Cie
- Build date: 1976
- Total produced: 6
Specifications
- Configuration
  - AAR: C-C
  - UIC: Co′Co′
- Gauge: 1,435 mm (4 ft 8 1/2 in)
- Bogies: Flexifloat
- Driver dia.: 1,040 mm (3 ft 5 in)
- Wheelbase: 12.2 metres (40 ft)
- Length: 17.4 metres (57 ft)
- Height: 4.5 metres (15 ft)
- Axle load: 18.5 t (41,000 lb)
- Loco weight: 111 t (245,000 lb)
- Traction motors: (6)
- Transmission: Diesel-electric
Performance figures
- Maximum speed: 85 km/h (53 mph)
- Power output: 1,440 kW (1,930 hp)
Career
- Operators: SBB-CFF-FFS
- Class: Am 6/6, later Am 861
- Numbers: 18521–18526
- Locale: Limmattal classification yard
- Disposition: All withdrawn

The Am 6/6, later known as Am 861, is a class of diesel shunting locomotive which were built for the Swiss Federal Railways (SBB) and were intended for use as heavy hump shunters at the Limmattal classification yard.

A total of six locomotives were built jointly by Thyssen Henschel and Brown, Boveri & Cie for SBB by and these received running numbers 18521 to 18526. In the late 1990s they received modernized electrical systems

The locomotives utilized a Co′Co′ wheel arrangement and a diesel-electric transmission, had six three-phase asynchronous traction motors and Flexifloat bogies (bogies without pivots and cradles) while being powered by 1.440 kW (1,930 hp) diesel engines.

In January 2004 locomotive 18524 was withdrawn to serve as a parts donor for the remainder of the class. The other five locomotives continued in service with SBB until March 2020, by which point the remainder were withdrawn from service. As of April 2020 these locomotives are awaiting to be scrapped.

== See also ==
- List of stock used by Swiss Federal Railways
