= SBB Em 3/3 =

Swiss diesel shunting locomotive

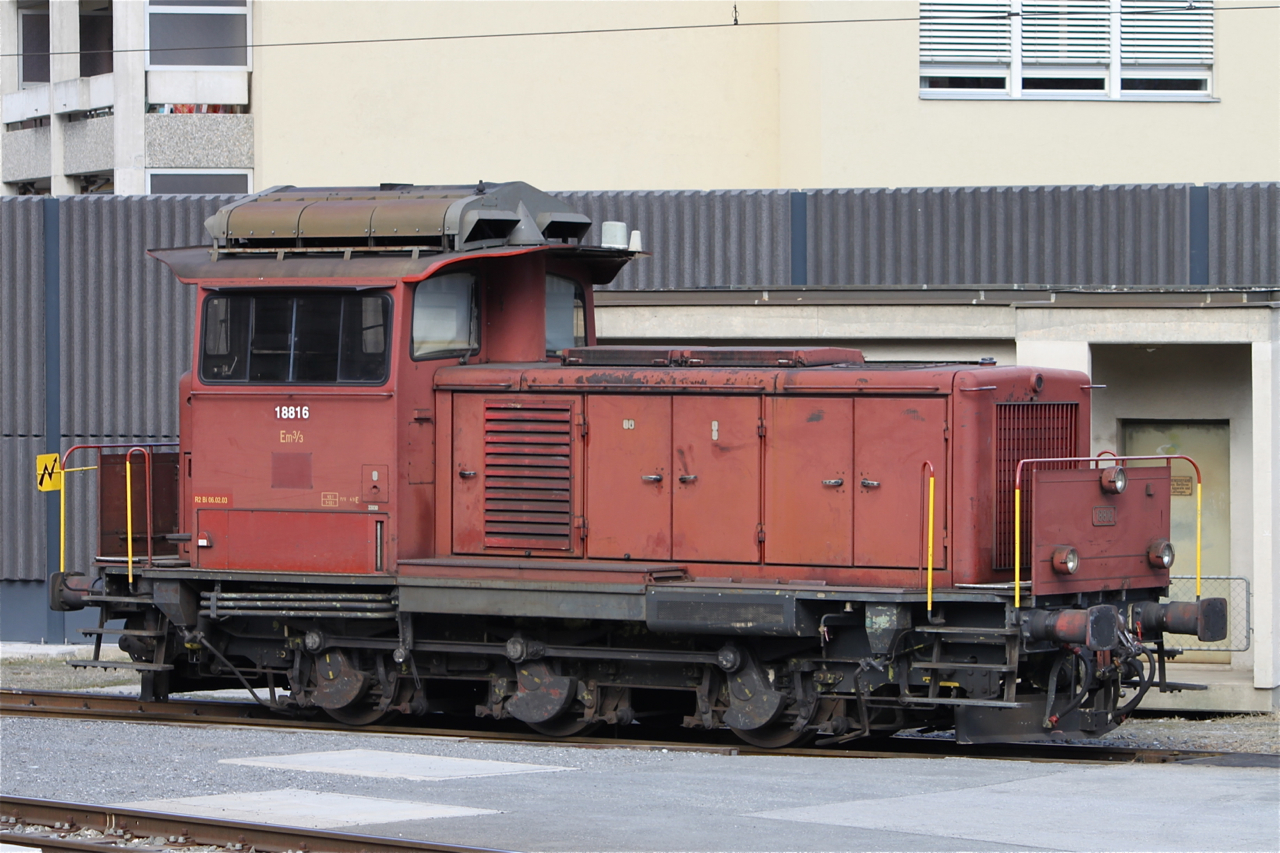
- Em 3/3 18816
Type and origin
- Power type: Diesel-electric
- Builder: SLM, BBC/SAAS
- Build date: 1959–1963
- Total produced: 42
Specifications
- Configuration
  - Whyte: 0-6-0DE
  - UIC: C
- Gauge: 1,435 mm (4 ft 8 1/2 in)
- Wheel diameter: 1,610 mm (63.4 in)
- Length: 10,020 mm (32 ft 10 in)
- Loco weight: 49 tonnes (48.2 long tons; 54.0 short tons)
Performance figures
- Maximum speed: 65 km/h (40 mph)
- Power output: 440 kW (590 hp)
Career
- Operators: Swiss Federal Railways
- Numbers: 18801–18841 / SZU 11
- Withdrawn: 2025

The SBB Em 3/3 is a diesel shunting locomotive of the Swiss Federal Railways (SBB). They were built between 1959 and 1963, with a total of 42 units being manufactured by the Swiss Locomotive and Machine Works. They were designed to perform shunting duties for the SBB and were assigned running numbers 18801 to 18841 and SZU 11 Leu.

Under the SBB they are classified as light shunters. Under SBBs later UIC classification system they were designated as being Em 830 class locomotives while being numbered 000 to 040.

== Preserved units ==
Preserved units
Locomotive	Owner	Operating
18808	Swiss Federal Railways (SBB)	inactive
18814	Stiftung Museumsbahn SEHR&RS	preserved, active
18815	DVZO	preserved, active
18822	DSF	preserved, active
18824	DVZO	preserved, active
18829	Stiftung Museumsbahn SEHR&RS	use for spare parts
18831	Swiss Federal Railways (SBB)	inactive
18832	Stiftung Museumsbahn SEHR&RS	use for spare parts
SZU 11	CSG Club del San Gottardo	preserved, active

== See also ==
- List of stock used by Swiss Federal Railways
