= SBB C 5/6 =

Swiss steam locomotive

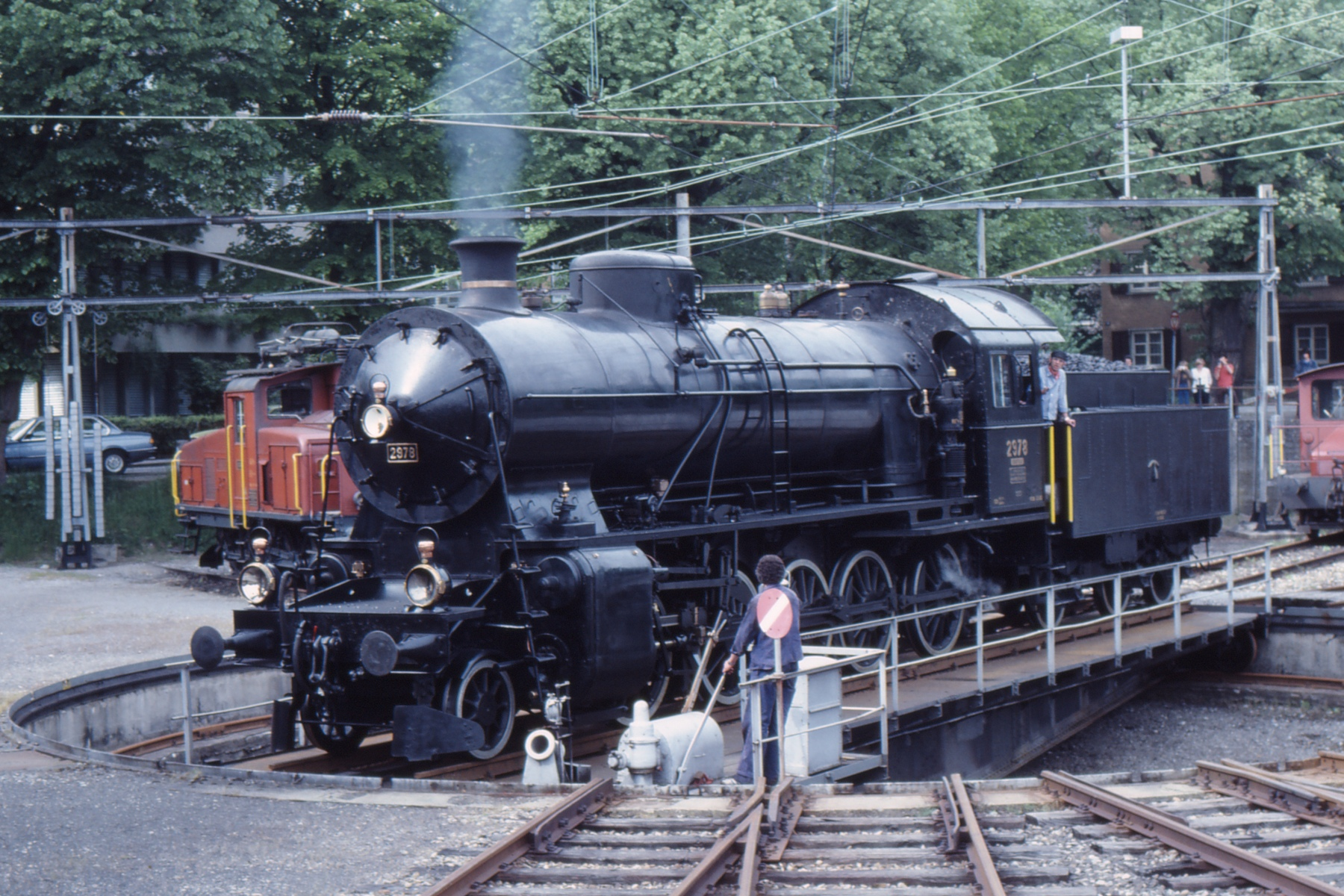
- Swiss steam Elephant SBB C 5/6 on the turntable at Winterthur
Type and origin
- Power type: Steam
- Builder: SLM Winterthur
- Build date: 1913–1917
- Total produced: 28
Specifications
- Configuration
  - Whyte: 2-10-0
  - UIC: 1′E h4v
- Gauge: 1,435 mm (4 ft 8 1/2 in)
- Driver dia.: 1,330 mm (52.4 in)
- Length: 19,195 mm (63 ft 0 in)
- Height: 4,480 mm (14 ft 8 in)
- Axle load: 15.8 t (15.6 long tons; 17.4 short tons)
- Adhesive weight: 79 t (77.8 long tons; 87.1 short tons)
- Total weight: 128 t (126.0 long tons; 141.1 short tons)
- Firebox
  - Grate area: 4 m^{2} (43 sq ft)
- Boiler pressure: 15 bar (1,500 kPa; 220 psi)
Performance figures
- Maximum speed: 65 km/h (40 mph)
- Power output: 1,190 kW (1,600 hp)
Career
- Operators: SBB-CFF-FFS
- Numbers: 2951–2978
- Nicknames: Elephant
- Withdrawn: Up to 1968
- Preserved: 4 (1 in working order)

The C 5/6 were a class of steam locomotives in use for the Swiss Federal Railways. 28 of them were built between 1913 and 1917; all had been withdrawn by 1968. Four have been preserved, one of them in working order. The class was designed for use on the steep inclines of the Gotthard route, and was considered extremely efficient, earning the nickname Elephant. Its design was based on the successful C 4/5 locomotive, and the result is the largest steam locomotive operated by the Swiss Federal Railways. Within a few years of introduction, however, they began to be replaced by new electric locomotives.

== Preservation ==
Number 2978, built in 1917, was the last steam locomotive built for Swiss Federal Railways, and is now part of the company's heritage fleet. In 1960, number 2978 was fitted with the boiler of number 2956. Number 2969, built in 1915, was restored and returned to service on 20 October 2017 by Eurovapor in Sulgen https://lapassiondutrain.blogspot.com/2017/10/suisse-remise-en-service-de-la-c-56.html They also have the number 2958 for spare parts (which was earlier in Olten) and will preserve it as an exhibit. Number 2965, not in working order, is an exhibit in the Swiss Transport Museum in Lucerne.

== See also ==
- List of stock used by Swiss Federal Railways
