= SBB RABDe 12/12 =

Swiss commuter train

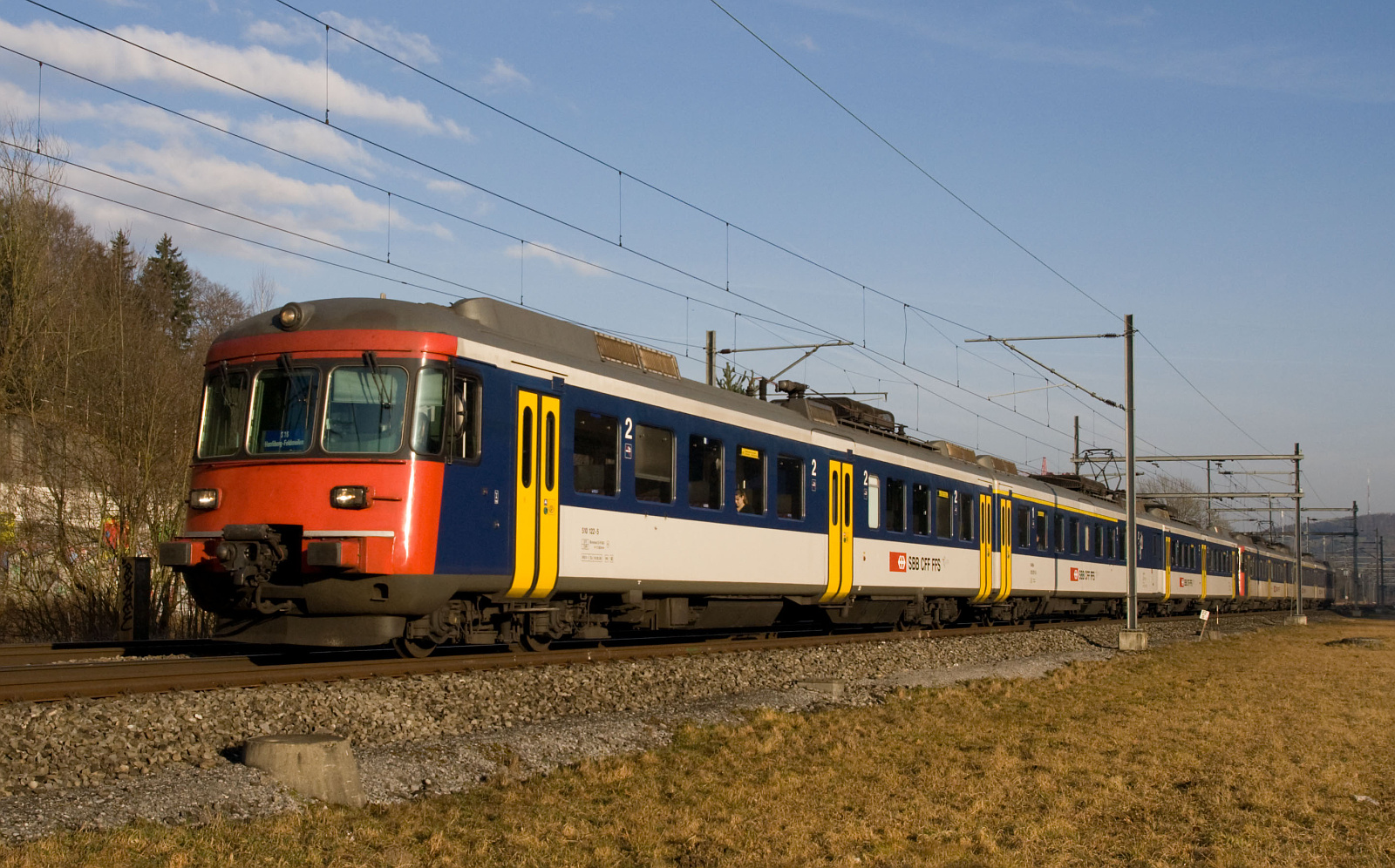
- Rebuilt RABDe 510 EMU between Winterthur and Zurich
- Manufacturer: Schindler Waggon Pratteln; FFA Altenrhein; BBC Baden; SAAS Genève
- Constructed: 1965–1967
- Refurbished: 1996–1999
- Scrapped: 2008-2010
- Number built: 20
- Number in service: 0
- Fleet numbers: 1101–1120
- Lines served: Zurich S-Bahn

Specifications
- Train length: 73,300 mm (240 ft 5.8 in)
- Maximum speed: 125 km/h (78 mph)
- Weight: 170 t (170 long tons; 190 short tons)
- Power output: 2,444 kW (3,277 hp)
- Tractive effort: 110 kN (25,000 lb_{f}) (continuous); 239 kN (54,000 lb_{f}) (maximum)
- UIC classification: Bo'Bo'+Bo'Bo'+Bo'Bo'

The RABDe 12/12 (later renumbered to RABDe 510) is a threepart electric multiple unit used for commuter traffic by the Swiss Federal Railways, SBB. The trains were put into service in the late 1960s and were in S-Bahn service around Zurich until December 2008.

== Introduction ==
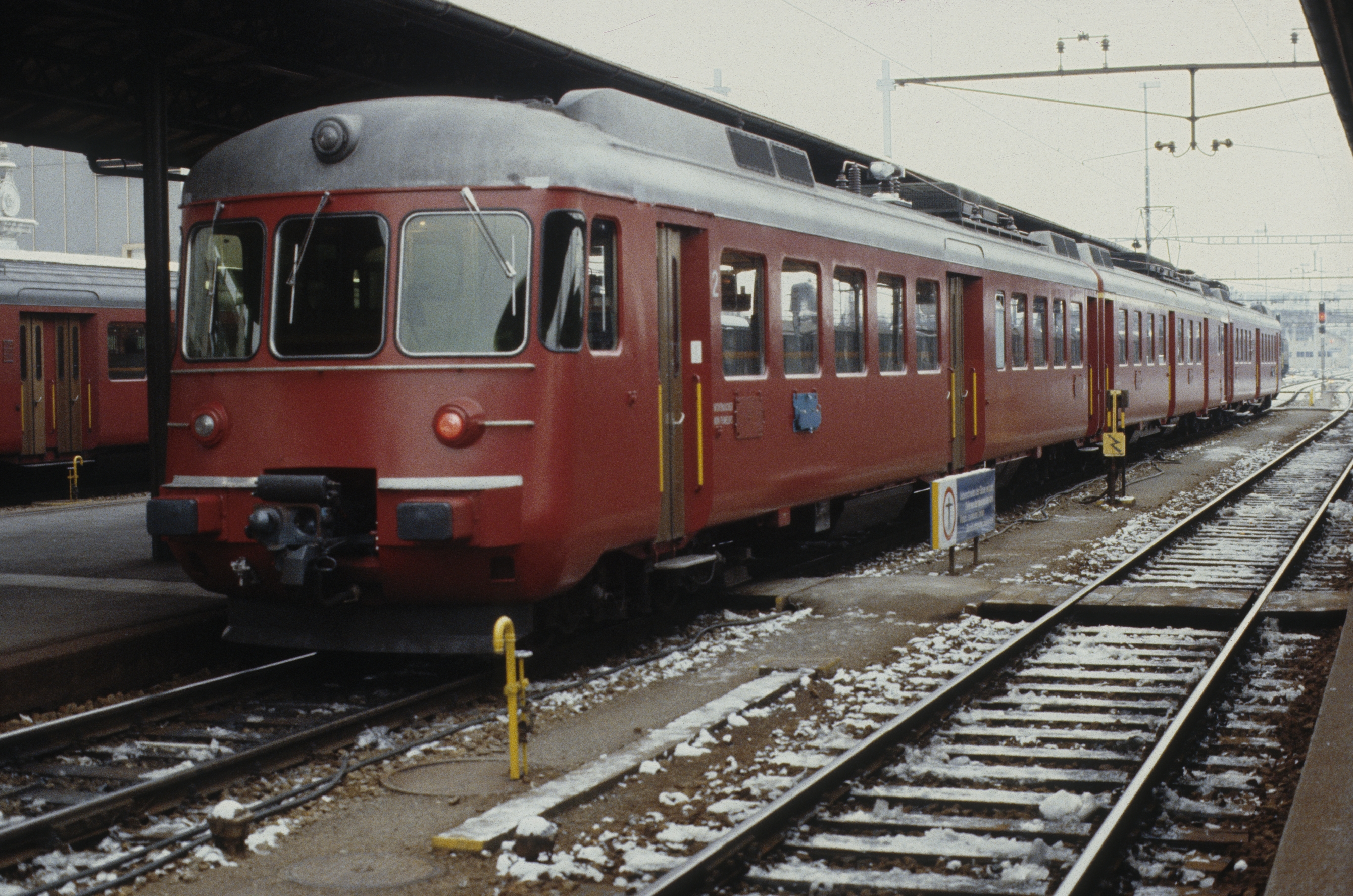
RABDe 12/12 on the "Gold Coast Line" in 1983.

For the introduction of more frequent service (every half an hour) on the "Golden Coast Line" ("Goldküstenlinie") Zurich–Meilen–Rapperswil, 20 electric multiple units RABDe 12/12 were put into service in 1967 to be able to maintain the tight schedule with the frequent stops. They consist of two second class end cars and a first class car with mail compartment in between. They originally had a claret livery, which was an exception at that time (most other SBB vehicles had the same green livery). They got the nickname "Golden Coast Express" ("Goldküstenexpress"), due to their service on the Golden Coast (which is the northern waterside of the lake of Zurich, known for its high land prices, thus attracting mainly wealthy levels of the population). With the introduction of the new double-decker S-Bahn trains in the 1990s, they lost their prestigious role and were subsequently used on lines with low passenger frequencies. The trains, which were all modernized in the 1990s, remained in S-Bahn service until December 2008. The last trainset was scrapped in 2010.

== Operation ==
The trainsets are equipped with automatic +GF+ couplers, allowing for economic operation. The three cars of a trainset are short-coupled and cannot be separated in regular service. Due to the low capacity of a single trainset, they are often used in pairs nowadays (an exception is the S24 service); up to four trainsets can be coupled together and be driven using multiple unit train control.

== Technology ==
The trains use conventional transformer technology with fixed running notches, which can be felt by the passengers while the train is accelerating, and are equipped with regenerative brakes. They feature an automatic speed control system, which allows the engineer to simply select the desired speed while the train chooses the running notches automatically, accelerating, decelerating or maintaining speed as desired.

== Accidents / Changes in designation / Revisions ==
Of the original 20 trainsets, four of them were badly damaged in two accidents in 1971. Trainsets 1119 and 1109 collided at Herrliberg, 1117 and 1113 at Uetikon. Both collisions damaged two end cars and one middle car each, which had to be scrapped. Four "new" units were built from the surviving parts and two uninvolved trainsets 1106 and 1111, resulting in the trainsets 1109^{II} and 1113^{II}, while trainset 1120 was renumbered to 1117^{II}.

All 18 remaining trainsets (1101–1118) were rebuilt after 30 years of service in the course of a total revision (R4). They were renumbered according to the new Swiss numbering scheme to RABDE 510 000- 510 017, got a new livery in NPZ-colors and automatic doors.

== Curios ==
The inconspicuous post in the middle of the entrance platforms of the two end cars is not primarily a handle for passengers, but leads the 15 kV traction current from the roof to the high voltage systems below the passenger compartment. Another notable fact is that all axles are driven, which is very unusual for commuter trains used by the SBB. Together with the high power these trains have at their disposal, they are able to accelerate very quickly, which led to another known nickname, "Mirage" (coming from the name of a fighter jet Dassault Mirage, bought by the Swiss Armed Forces at about the same time).

== See also ==
- List of stock used by Swiss Federal Railways

== Sources ==
This article was mostly translated from the German language version of July 2006.
