= Landquart-Davos G 3/4 =

Swiss narrow-gauge steam locomotive class

Landquart-Davos G 3/4 Rhaetian Railway G 3/4
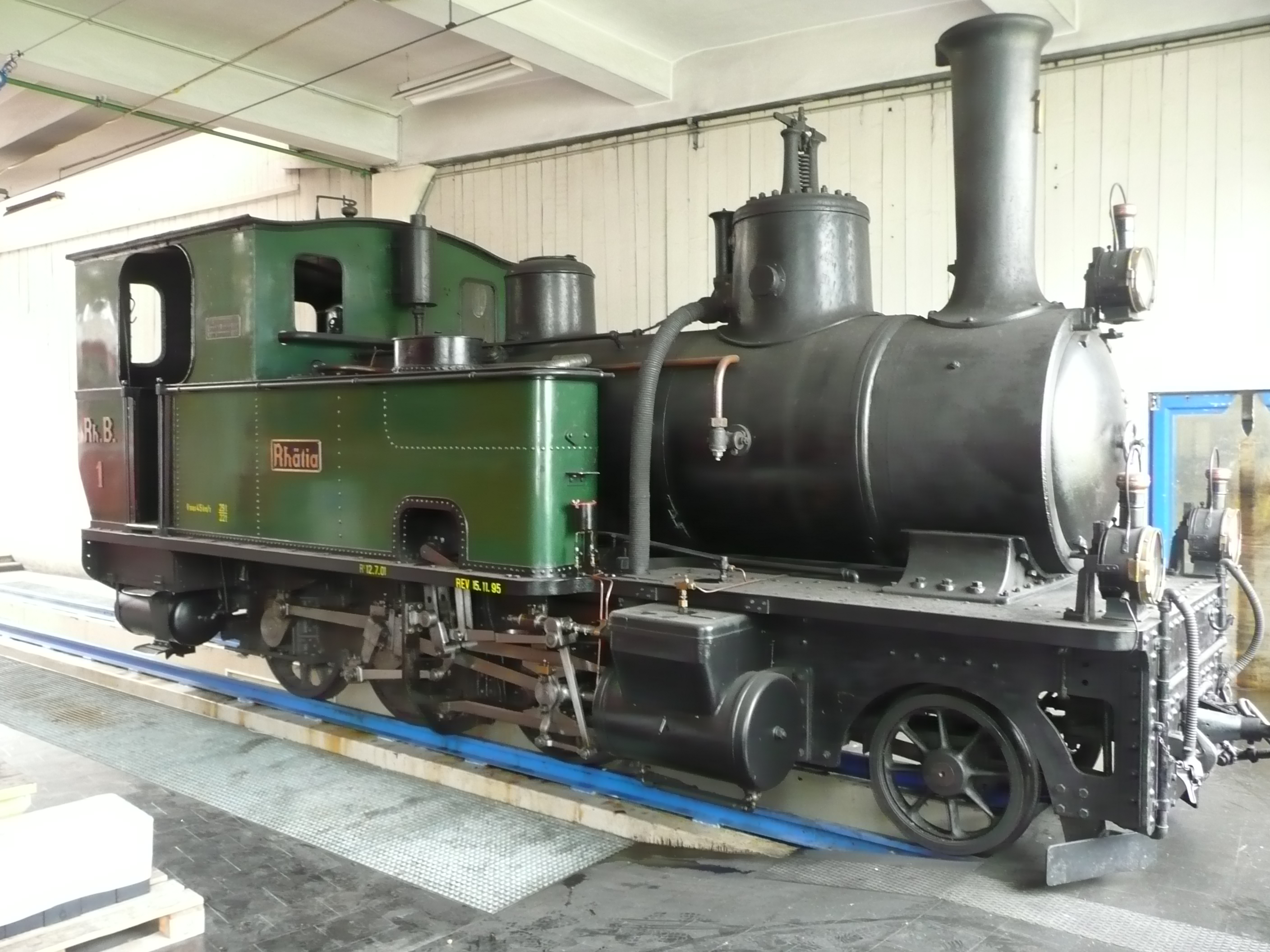
- G 3/4 No. 1 inside Landquart locomotive depot.
Type and origin
- Power type: Steam
- Builder: Swiss Locomotive and Machine Works
- Build date: 1889–1908
- Total produced: 16
Specifications
- Configuration
  - Whyte: 2-6-0T
  - UIC: 1′C n2t
- Gauge: 1,000 mm (3 ft 3 3/8 in)
- Leading dia.: 700 mm (27.56 in)
- Driver dia.: 1,050 mm (41.34 in)
- Length: 7,945 mm (26 ft 1 in)
- Loco weight: 30.2 tonnes (66,600 lb)
- Fuel type: Coal
- Fuel capacity: 950 kilograms (2,090 lb)
- Water cap.: 2,600 L (570 imp gal; 690 US gal)
- Boiler pressure: 12 bar (1.20 MPa; 174 psi)
- Cylinders: Two, outside
- Cylinder size: 340 mm × 500 mm (13.39 in × 19.69 in)
Performance figures
- Maximum speed: 45 km/h (28 mph)
- Power output: 250 PS (184 kW; 247 hp) at 20 km/h (12 mph)
Career
- Operators: Landquart–Davos Railway (to 1895); Rhaetian Railway from 1895)
- Class: G 3/4
- Numbers: 1–16
- Locale: Graubünden, Switzerland
- Retired: 1917–1977
- Preserved: 2 (in service); 1 (not currently operational)

The Landquart-Davos G 3/4, also known as the Rhaetian Railway G 3/4, was a class of lightweight metre gauge 2-6-0T steam locomotives operated from 1889 by the Landquart-Davos Narrow Gauge Railway (LD), 1895 renamed to Rhaetian Railway (RhB) in the Canton of Graubünden, Switzerland.

The G 3/4 class was so named under the Swiss locomotive and railcar classification system. According to that system, G 3/4 denotes a narrow gauge steam locomotive with a total of four axles, three of which are drive axles. Prior to 1902, the class was known as the G 3 class, under an earlier classification system.

A total of 16 examples of the G 3/4 class entered service between 1889 and 1908. Built as tank locomotives by the Swiss Locomotive and Machine Works (SLM) in Winterthur, the G 3/4s were made redundant by electrification of the RhB network between 1913 and 1922. Most of the class were then sold to other railways, but three preserved examples remain, two on the Rhaetian Railway and one on the Appenzeller Bahnen. These locomotives are kept in working order for occasional steam trains.

== Technical details ==
=== First series ===
The first five examples of the G 3/4 class were delivered by SLM in 1889, in time for the opening of the LD line. These saturated steam machines were similar to a class of locomotives that SLM had delivered in 1887 to the railway now known as the Ferrovie della Sardegna in Sardinia. Delivery to Sardinia was continued and reached a total of 47 locomotives in 1894.

Rated at 190 kilowatts (250 hp) each, the first five G 3/4s were given the traffic numbers 1 to 5. They were used initially to haul all traffic on the line, and that often led to problems, especially on the steeply graded section between Klosters and Davos. Traffic increases over the line soon outreached the capacity of the G 3/4s and led to the purchase of two G 2x2/2 Mallet 0-4-4-0T locomotives in 1891, allowing the G 3/4s to be transferred to less demanding duties.

=== Second series ===
The opening of the line from Landquart to Thusis in 1896 was the catalyst for the ordering of three further G 3/4s, which were numbered 6 to 8. These machines were more powerful than the earlier engines, and had larger coal bunkers and water tanks.

=== Third series ===
Eight additional locomotives followed in three batches between 1901 and 1908, and were allocated traffic numbers 9 to 16. These locomotives were further improved and enlarged in comparison with the older machines. Their dry weight was therefore around 4 tonnes (3.9 long tons; 4.4 short tons) greater than that of the first series.

The G 3/4s of the final series were used in light passenger and freight traffic, and on construction trains.

== Disposal ==
The complete electrification of the Rhaetian Railway network between 1913 and 1922 rendered the G 3/4 class locomotives surplus to requirements. Three locomotives from the original batch, G 3/4s Nos 3-5 were sold to the Prince-Henri-Railway in Luxembourg in 1917 and renumbered 53–55. All three locomotives were later taken over by the Deutsche Reichsbahn-Gesellschaft in 1943 and were renumbered in the DRG narrow-gauge series as 99 271-99 273; on return to state control in 1945 the locomotives were renumbered as CFL 351-353 and continued in service until they were retired and scrapped in 1954.

The RhB sold a further four engines in 1923; No 6 Landquart to the Administration of the Port of Recife in Pernambuco state, Brazil where its eventual fate is unknown while Nos 7-8 were sold to the Domodossola–Locarno railway for use on construction trains until they were retired and scrapped in 1943. No 12 was sold to the Sagunt steel works in Spain and renumbered as No 207 Algimia for use around the works until it too was withdrawn and scrapped, sometime during 1970.

Of the remaining locomotives, the RhB sold Nos 9-10 and 15–16 to the Brünigbahn in 1926 and 1924 respectively where they worked together with eight locomotives of the same type delivered by SLM in 1905–13 until they were withdrawn and scrapped in 1941–42, when Brünigbahn was electrified. No 2 Prättigau was withdrawn and scrapped in 1925, while No 1 Rhätia was withdrawn in 1928 and placed in storage for a planned Swiss railway museum. The remaining three engines, Nos 11, 13, and 14, remained in service as shunting locomotives and reserve engines in case of electrical power failures. No 13 was the last G 3/4 to be withdrawn and scrapped by the RhB in 1950, while Nos 11 and 14 continued in service until 1977 and 1972 respectively.

== Preservation ==
No 1 Rhätia was retired in 1928 and placed in storage in various places on the RhB network pending the construction of a Swiss railway museum, later incorporated into the Swiss Transport Museum. After the STM decided not to add No 1 to its collection, the RhB loaned No 1 to the Blonay–Chamby museum railway. The locomotive was recalled by the RhB in 1988 and restored to working order for the centenary of the G 3/4 class locomotives in 1989. No 1 has since been kept in working order at the Landquart locomotive depot as part of the RhB's heritage fleet along with two G 4/5 class locomotives, nos. 107 and 108, based at Samedan.

No 11, carrying the name Heidi since its involvement in the eponymous film of the same name in 1952, was retired in 1977 and gifted to the Eiger Model Railway Friends in Zweilütschinen for use on heritage services on the Berner Oberland Bahn and Brünigbahn. The locomotive's boiler was damaged in 1990 and No 11 was placed in storage until 1999, when she was returned to Graubünden by the RhB's preservation society, Club 1889. The restoration by Club 1889 and Dampflokomotiv- und Maschinenfabrik DLM was finished in July 2014, Heidi emerging from Samaden depot with a new boiler equipped with superheating tubes. New pistons, new piston rods and new valves and valve rods were incorporated as well. The new boiler is light oil fired, thus reducing the danger of spark emission through the chimney allowing use even in dry periods with risk of wildfires. Usually every coal fired steam train on RhB has to be followed by a special fire fighter train, this extra cost can be avoided using the oil fired No 11. A new rule by the Swiss federal rail inspector BAV requests an automatic supervision of the oil burner, as on stationary unattended boilers. The locomotive has not been cleared for line working until a judgement of the situation has been made.

No 14, which was never named in service, was retired in 1972 after spending most of its life either shunting or in reserve in case of electrical failure on the RhB main line network. Shortly after withdrawal, No 14 was sold to a private association Dampfloki-Verein Appenzeller Bahnen for use on heritage services on the Gossau–Wasserauen line of Appenzeller Bahnen (AB), where two similar locomotives worked between 1886/87 and 1933 (SLM no. 428 and 459, built as C1', scrapped 1952 and 1941). No. 14 was stored between 2003 and 2018, then transferred to the association La Traction at the Chemins de fer de Jura.

== List of locomotives ==
List of the G 3/4 locomotives of the Rhaetian Railway
Traffic number	Builders number	Commissioning	Name	Withdrawal	Later history
1	577	08.07.1889	Rhätia	1928	1970 to the Blonay-Chamby railway, returned to RhB in 1988. Kept at Landquart as an operational heritage locomotive
2	578	05.08.1889	Prättigau	1925	scrapped
3	579	16.08.1889	Davos	1917	to Prince-Henri-Railway, Luxembourg (No. 53), 1943 DRB 99 271, 1945 CFL 351, scrapped 1954
4	580	10.10.1889	Flüela	1917	to Prince-Henri-Railway, Luxembourg (No. 54), 1943 DRB 99 272, 1945 CFL 352, scrapped 1954
5	581	13.10.1889	Engadin	1917	to Prince-Henri-Railway, Luxembourg (No. 55), 1943 DRB 99 273, 1945 CFL 353, scrapped 1954
6	960	05.03.1896	Landquart	1923	1923 sold to Administração Portuária do Recife (APR; Port of Recife) in the state of Pernambuco, Brazil; missing
7	961	19.03.1896	Chur	1923	1923 to Domodossola–Locarno railway, scrapped 1943
8	962	01.04.1896	Thusis	1923	1923 to Domodossola–Locarno railway, scrapped 1943
9	1369	10.06.1901	--	1926	1926 to Brünigbahn (No. 217), scrapped 1941
10	1370	25.06.1901	--	1926	1926 to Brünigbahn (No. 218), scrapped 1942
11	1476	08.01.1903	Heidi	1977	1977 to Eiger model railway friends, 1999 to Club 1889. Restored to working order at Samedan Depot in 2014
12	1477	23.01.1903	--	1923	1923 to Sagunt steel works, Spain (No. 207, Algimia), scrapped about 1970
13	1478	02.02.1903	--	1950	scrapped
14	1479	06.02.1903	Madlaina	1972	1972 to a private association on Appenzeller Bahnen, maintained in operational condition. Stored 2003–2018, then transferred to the association La Traction at the Chemins de fer de Jura. Baptized to the name "Madlaina" in 2015.
15	1910	31.07.1908	--	1924	1924 to Brünigbahn (No. 215), scrapped 1942
16	1911	31.07.1908	--	1924	1924 to Brünigbahn (No. 216), scrapped 1942

== Sources, further reading ==
=== Literature ===
- Wolfgang Finke, Hans Schweers: Die Fahrzeuge der Rhätischen Bahn. Band 3 Lokomotiven, Triebwagen, Traktoren 1889-1998. Verlag Schweers+Wall, Aachen (now Köln) 1998, ISBN 3-89494-105-7.
- Claude Jeanmaire: Die Dampflokomotiven der Rhätischen Bahn - Von der Landquart-Davos-Bahn zur Rhätischen Bahn. Verlag Eisenbahn, Villingen 1974, ISBN 3-85649-022-1
- Hans-Bernhard Schönborn, Die Rhätische Bahn, Geschichte und Gegenwart, GeraMond 2009 ISBN 978-3-7654-7162-9.
