= SBB B 3/4 =

Swiss steam locomotive

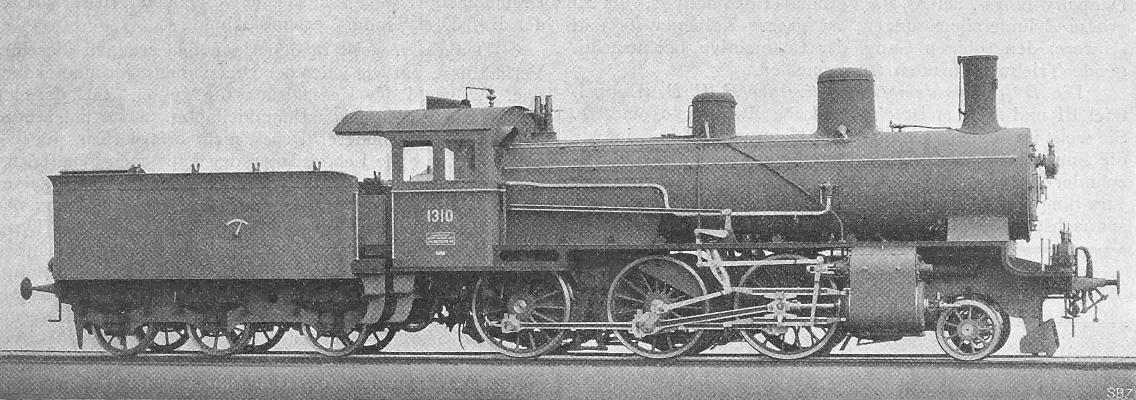
- Builder's photo of B 3/4 class locomotive number 1310 in August 1907
Type and origin
- Power type: Steam
- Builder: SLM Winterthur
- Build date: 1905–1916
- Total produced: 69
Specifications
- Configuration
  - Whyte: 2-6-0
  - UIC: 1′C
- Gauge: 1,435 mm (4 ft 8 1/2 in)
- Length: 16,275 mm (53 ft 5 in)
- Height: 4,265 mm (14 ft 0 in)
- Loco weight: 95 tonnes (93 long tons; 105 short tons)
Performance figures
- Maximum speed: 75 km/h (47 mph)
- Power output: 730 kW (980 hp)
Career
- Operators: SBB, NS
- Numbers: 1301–1369 SBB, 3000-3005 NS
- Preserved: No. 1367
- Current owner: Heritage Foundation SBB

The Swiss Class B 3/4 locomotives were built between 1905 and 1916 for the Swiss Federal Railways. In total 69 2-6-0 locomotives of this type were built, and numbered 1301–1369.

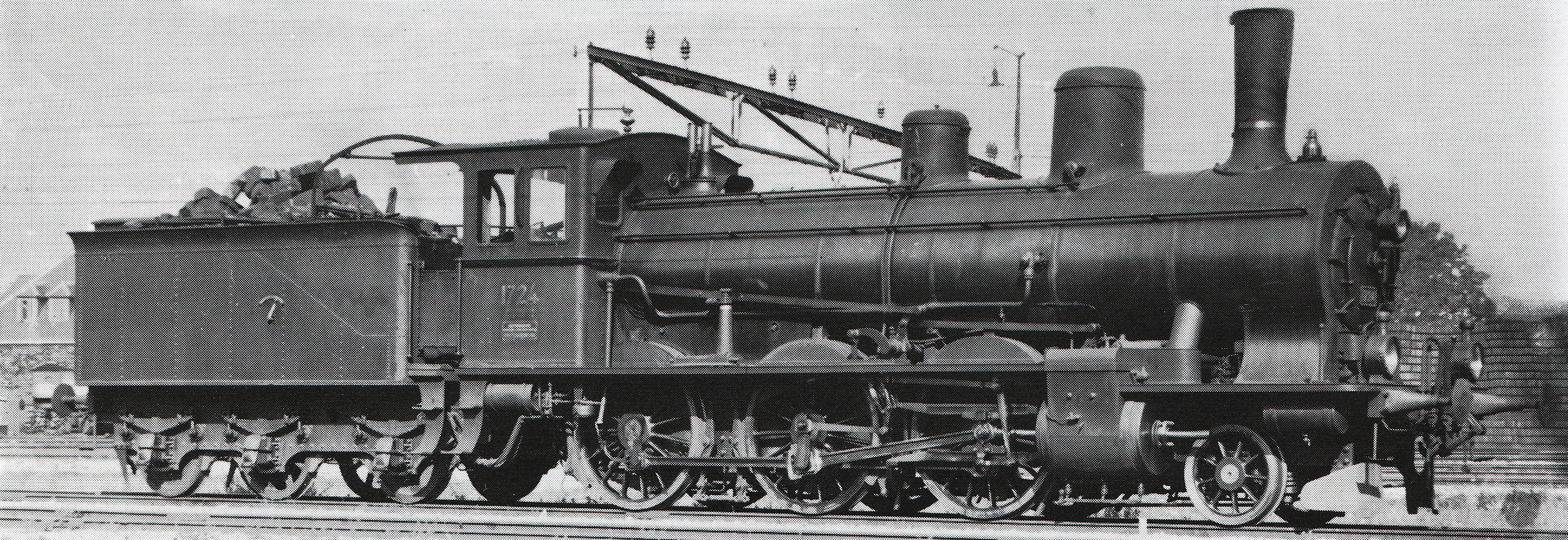
B 3/4 class locomotive number 1724

After the Second World War, the NS urgently needed equipment, the series SBB B 3/4 of the SBB was out of service. The NS bought 5 steam locomotives, the 1096, 1172, 1530, 1629 and 1767 at NS they got the numbers 3001, 3002, 3003, 3004, 3005.

== Preservation ==
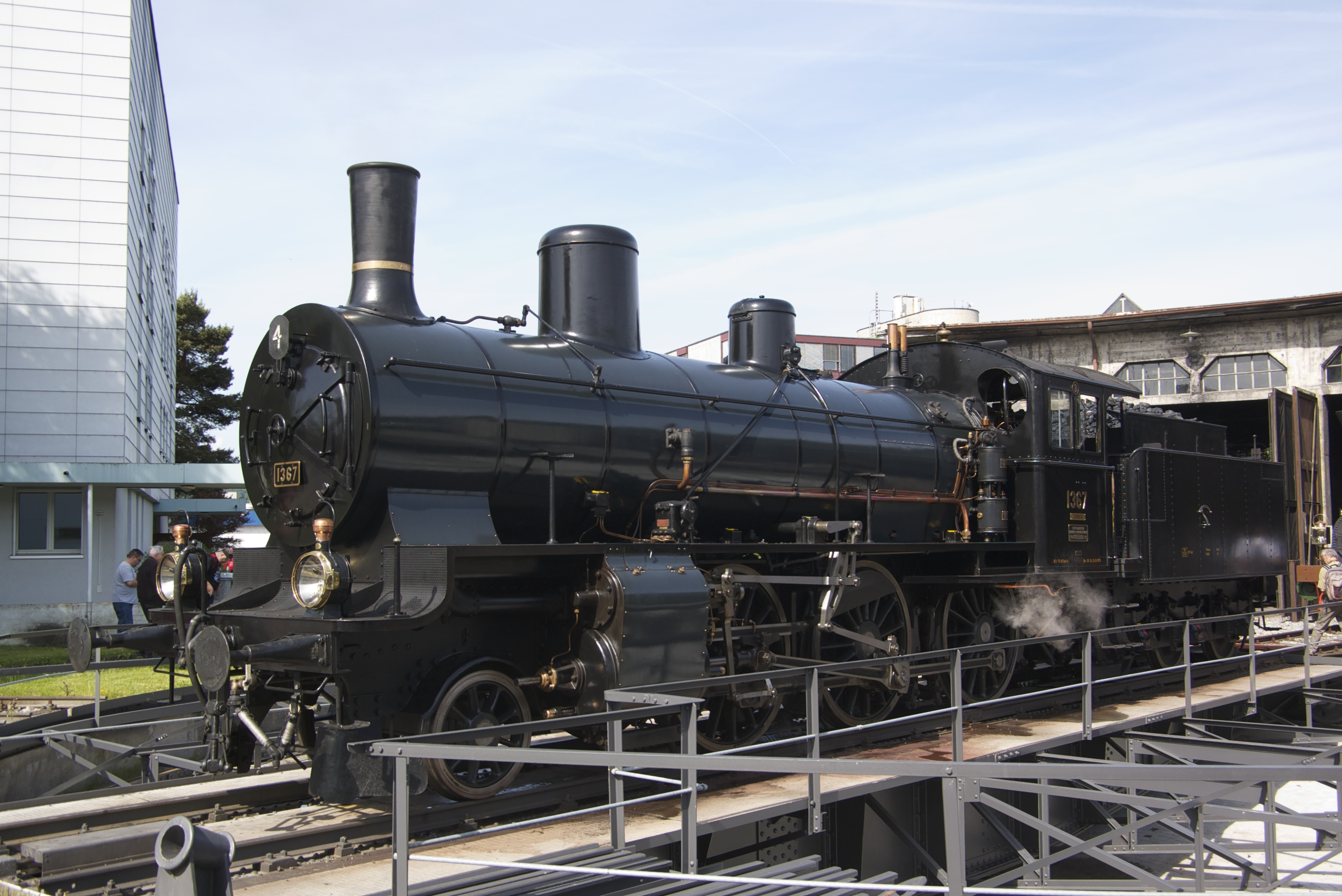
1367, preserved in 2015

One locomotive of this type has been preserved. This is Number 1367, built in 1916.

== See also ==
- List of stock used by Swiss Federal Railways
