= SBB Ce 6/6 =

Swiss electric locomotive

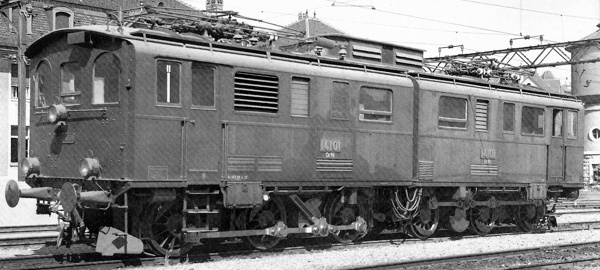
- Ce 6/6 in the 1930s
Type and origin
- Power type: Electric
- Builder: Siemens-Schuckert
- Build date: 1912
- Total produced: 1
Specifications
- Configuration
  - UIC: C+C
- Gauge: 1,435 mm (4 ft 8 1/2 in)
- Wheelbase: 1,930 mm (6 ft 4 in)
- Length: 14,800 mm (48 ft 7 in) over buffers
- Loco weight: 103 tonnes (101 long tons; 114 short tons)
- Electric system/s: 15 kV 16 2/3 Hz AC Catenary
- Current pickup: Pantograph
- Traction motors: Two
- Train brakes: Air
Performance figures
- Maximum speed: 60 km/h (37 mph)
- Power output: One hour: 1,104 kW (1,480 hp)
Career
- Operators: SBB
- Numbers: 12200 until 1920, 14101 after 1920
- Delivered: 1919
- Retired: 1937
- Preserved: None

The Ce 6/6 was an electric locomotive operated by Schweizerischen Bundesbahnen (Swiss Federal Railways) (SBB). The sole Ce 6/6 was a double locomotive consisting of two identical halves permanently connected, each half having three driving axles. Each engine had a drivers cab, with a large electric motor mounted behind driving three axles.

== Description ==
The locomotive was originally ordered from Siemens-Schuckert by Malmbanan in Sweden in 1912 to operate at 15 kV and 15 Hz. The locomotive was not delivered due to World War I and the changing requirements of its Swedish purchaser, and was instead bought by SBB in 1919.

The design was typical of German locomotives for heavy goods trains. It consisted of an 11 t electrical motor in each half that drove a countershaft connected by side rods to the three driving axles.

Electrically, the two halves were identical twins. In case of a fault in one half, the other could operate the locomotive after isolating its faulty half. In normal operation, either cab could control itself and its counterpart. Since passenger operation was not foreseen, there was no provision for train power, only locomotive power.

== Service ==
Originally delivered to SBB's Bern depot as an Fc 2x3/3 number 12200, it was reclassified into a Ce 6/6 and renumbered 14101 in 1920. The locomotive was used to pull goods trains between Bern and Thun. It was retired early in 1937 due to the high maintenance costs inherent in running a unique engine.

== Röthenbachsäge ==
The Ce 6/6 was known as Röthenbachsäge, named after the sawmill near Röthenbach im Emmental, due to the mechanical sawing sound of its low speed engine.
