= SBB Ce 6/8 III =

Swiss electrical freight locomotive

Ce 6/8^{III} / Be 6/8^{III}
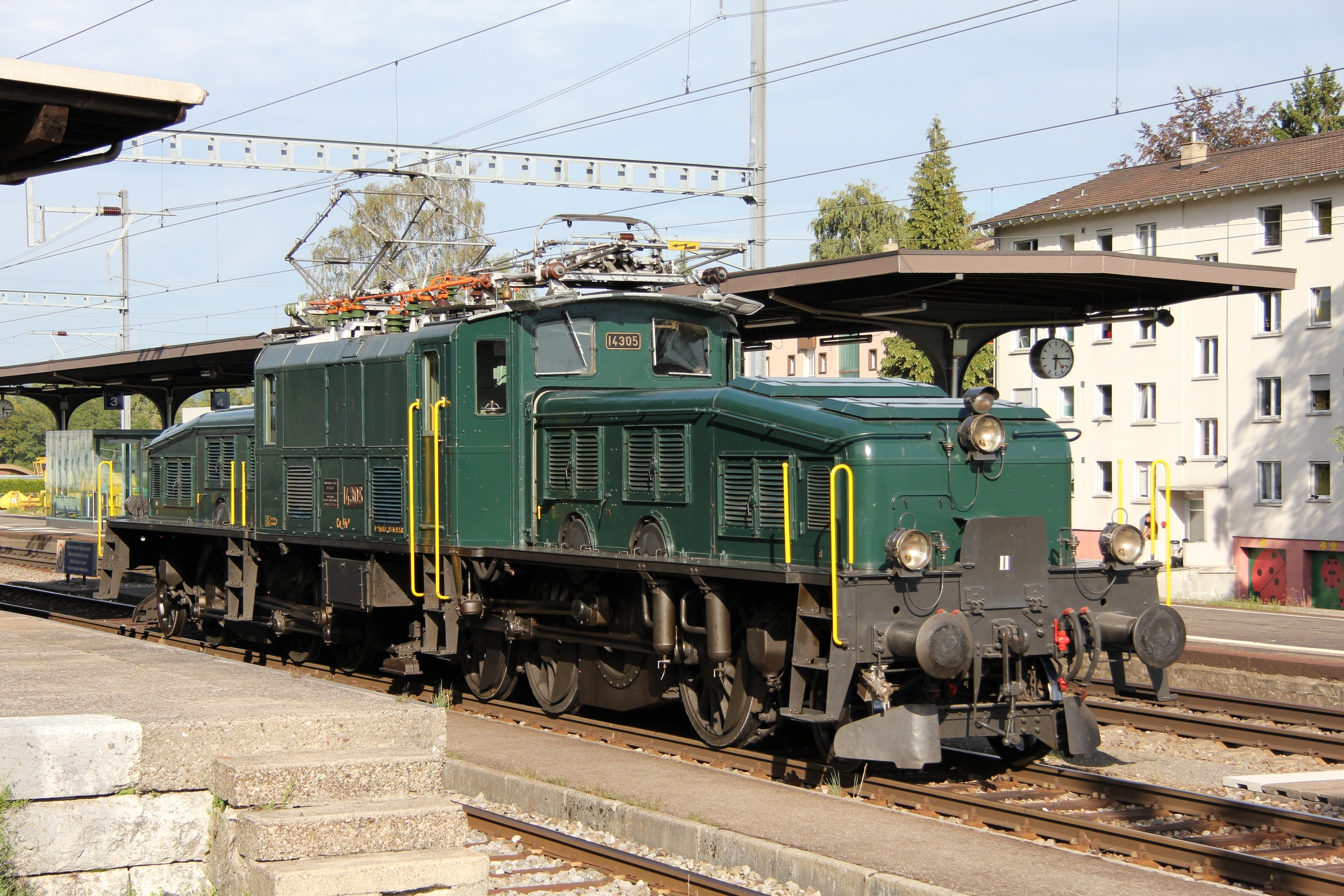
- SBB historic Ce 6/8^{III} 14305 in Oberbuchsiten, 2011
Type and origin
- Builder: SLM (mechanical), MFO (electrical)
- Build date: 1926–1927
- Total produced: 18
Specifications
- Configuration
  - UIC: 1'C+C1'
- Gauge: 1,435 mm (4 ft 8 1/2 in)
- Driver dia.: 1,350 mm
- Carrying wheel diameter: 950 mm
- Length
  - Over beams: 20,060 mm
- Adhesive weight: 108 t
- Service weight: 131 t
Performance figures
- Maximum speed: 65 km/h 75 km/h (from 1956, as Be 6/8^{III})
- Power output
  - 1 hour: 1,810 kW (2,430 hp) at 35 km/h
  - Continuous: 1,190 kW (1,600 hp) at 38 km/h
Career
- Numbers: 14301–14318; 13301–13318 (from 1956, as Be 6/8^{III})
- Retired: mid-1967 – 1977

The Ce 6/8^{III} (later classified Be 6/8^{III}) was a class of electric locomotives built by the Swiss Federal Railways (SBB) primarily for freight use in the Swiss lowlands, though they were rapidly recruited for use on the mountainous Gotthardbahn. They represented a refinement of the design of the SBB Ce 6/8 II series, with more powerful motors and improved electrical components and a simpler rod drive system. Like their predecessors, they shared an articulated design that led to their also being nicknamed Crocodiles. The Ce 6/8^{III}s were largely retired in the 1970s, but two units are preserved as historic vehicles.

== History ==
Electrification of the Swiss railways in the 1920s placed demands on the SBB to exploit the new infrastructure with suitable freight locomotives. The Ce 6/8^{II} already provided a Gotthard freight locomotive, but now the SBB needed one for lowland operation too, so put out a tender for designs. Having a successful example in the Ce 6/8^{II}, the bid from Maschinenfabrik Oerlikon (MFO) based on it was attractive. The SBB decided to commission a new series of 18 locomotives with modest performance improvements. The bid for new locomotives increased the continuous power requirements from the previous series (1650 kW to 1800 kW), and correspondingly higher loads: 1400 t uphill at 35 km/h in the flatlands with no more than a 10‰ gradient, 700 t downhill, and 520 t uphill on the Gotthard's 26‰ prevailing grades.

As for the Ce 6/8^{II}, the contracts were awarded to MFO for the electrical part and Schweizerische Lokomotiv- und Maschinenfabrik (SLM) for the mechanical part.

== Technology ==
=== Mechanical part ===
The main change from the previous series was the simplification of the coupling rod. Rather than using the mechanically complex jackshaft – dead-shaft arrangement upon which the triangular frame was hung to power the three driving axles, SLM opted for the simpler Winterthur type inclined rod drive, apparently satsified with its performance on the Ce 6/8^{I}, with which it now had operational experience.

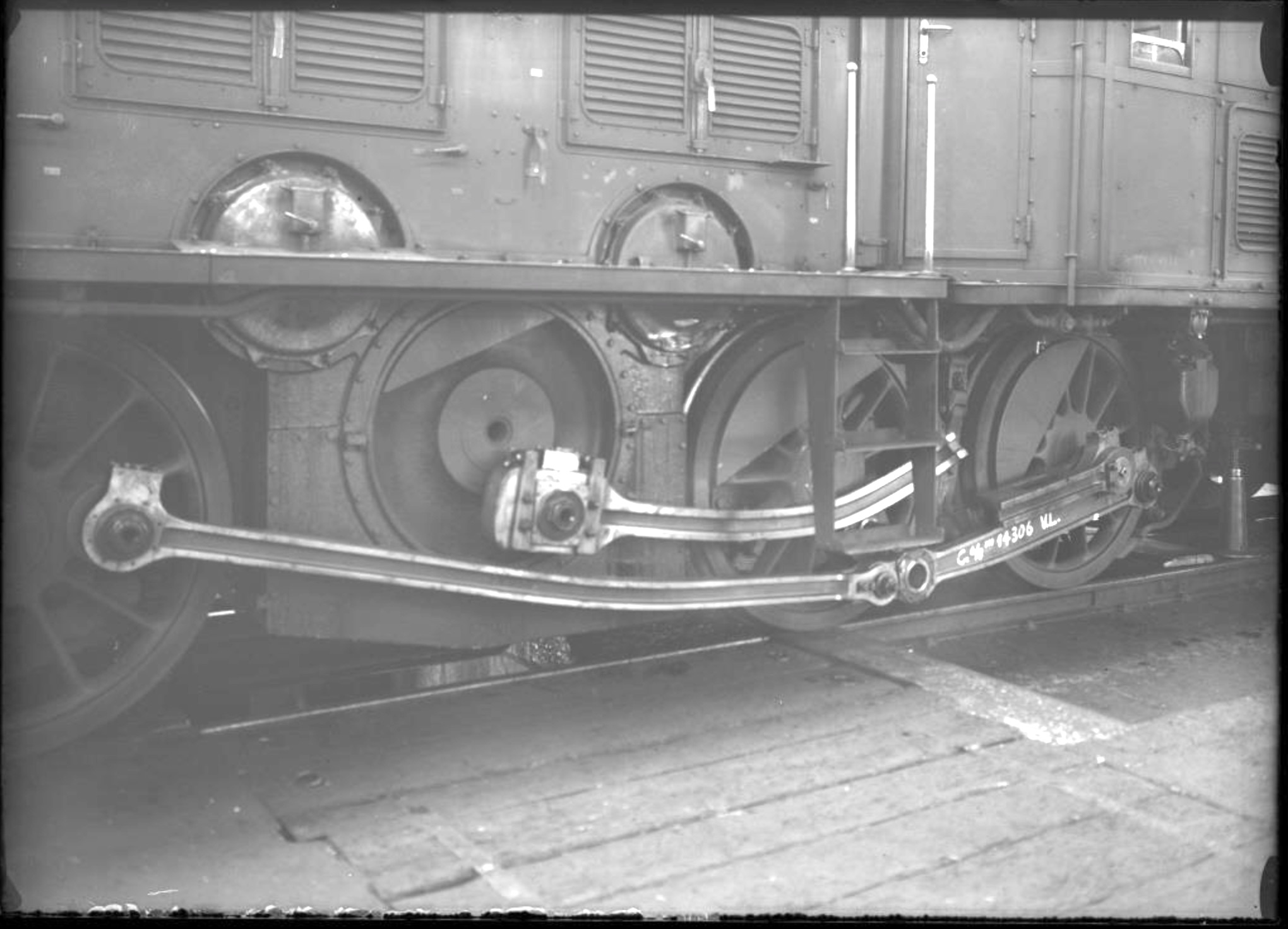
Bent rods on a Ce 6/8 III locomotive

Due to the need for an inflexible connection of the rod between the jackshaft and the drive wheel to ensure smooth power delivery, vertical motion between the jackshaft and the wheel could not be tolerated. SLM engineers surmised that this motion was limited enough to be taken up by the rod metal's inherent elasticity, provided the speed was not too great (70 km/h or less). The design's gently sloped rod, reaching to the rearmost driven axle from the jackshaft, geometrically lessened the rod stresses due to vertical motion.

The two bogies of the Ce 6/8^{III} were each 300 mm longer than its predecessor, the bogie hoods were slightly wider, and the front grilles removed, lending the design a somewhat beefier look than the Ce 6/8^{II}.

=== Electrical part ===
A new main switch, designed by Brown Boveri (BBC), was part of the redesign of the series. It was an oil-filled switch with an explosion flap to prevent vaporized oil buildup.

The transformer used was the same as for the Ae 3/6^{II}. A 23 position, servo-controlled stepper was used for throttle control, similar to that used for Ce 6/8^{II} nos. 14266-14283. Wiring of the traction motor groups was simplified by using only one reversing and disconnection switch per group. This meant that a malfunction of one motor would render the whole locomotive inoperable, but experience proved this was an unlikely failure.

The new units were equipped with electric, regenerative brakes like their predecessors. A transformer oil pump dumped the internal heat to exterior radiators. The fan motor that cooled the traction motors also drove the 36 V motor-generator for battery charging and for operating the locomotive control circuits. If the motor ventilation was shut off, so was battery charging. Only one air compressor was installed, located at the nose of motor group II.

== Operational use ==
Though planned as lowland freight locomotives, after the first deliveries in 1926 the Ce 6/8^{III}s also started working on the Gotthard, based in Erstfeld and then Biasca. By 1930 the whole series was assigned to Gotthard use. Due to better train brakes, in the flat approaches to the Gotthard the locomotives could actually exceed their speed limit of 65 km/h. In 1953–1954 SBB allowed some units to run at the higher limit of 75 km/h. The success of this trial led them to be reclassified in 1956 as Be 6/8^{III} without any mechanical changes. They were renumbered 13301-13318. At higher speeds, however, the concerns about the rod drive manifested themselves, and the SBB's Bellinzona workshops reported increased traction motor damage.

The delivery of SBB's Ae 6/6 series displaced the Be 6/8s and Ce 6/8s from Gotthard use. They took up lowland haulage jobs, running first out of Basel and then diffusing into service in western Switzerland where they'd never before been seen. Retirements of the Ce 6/8^{III} began in 1967. Towards the end of their lives, in 1973 they were downgraded to a maximum speed of 65 km/h. The last unit retired in 1977.

== Preservation ==
Two units still exist:

- 13302 on permanent loan by SBB Historic to MECH (Horgen Model Railway Club) / Betriebsgruppe 13302, Rapperswil
- 14305 at SBB Historic, Olten

== See also ==
- Swiss locomotive and railcar classification
