= SBB Be 4/6 12303-12342 =

Swiss electric locomotive

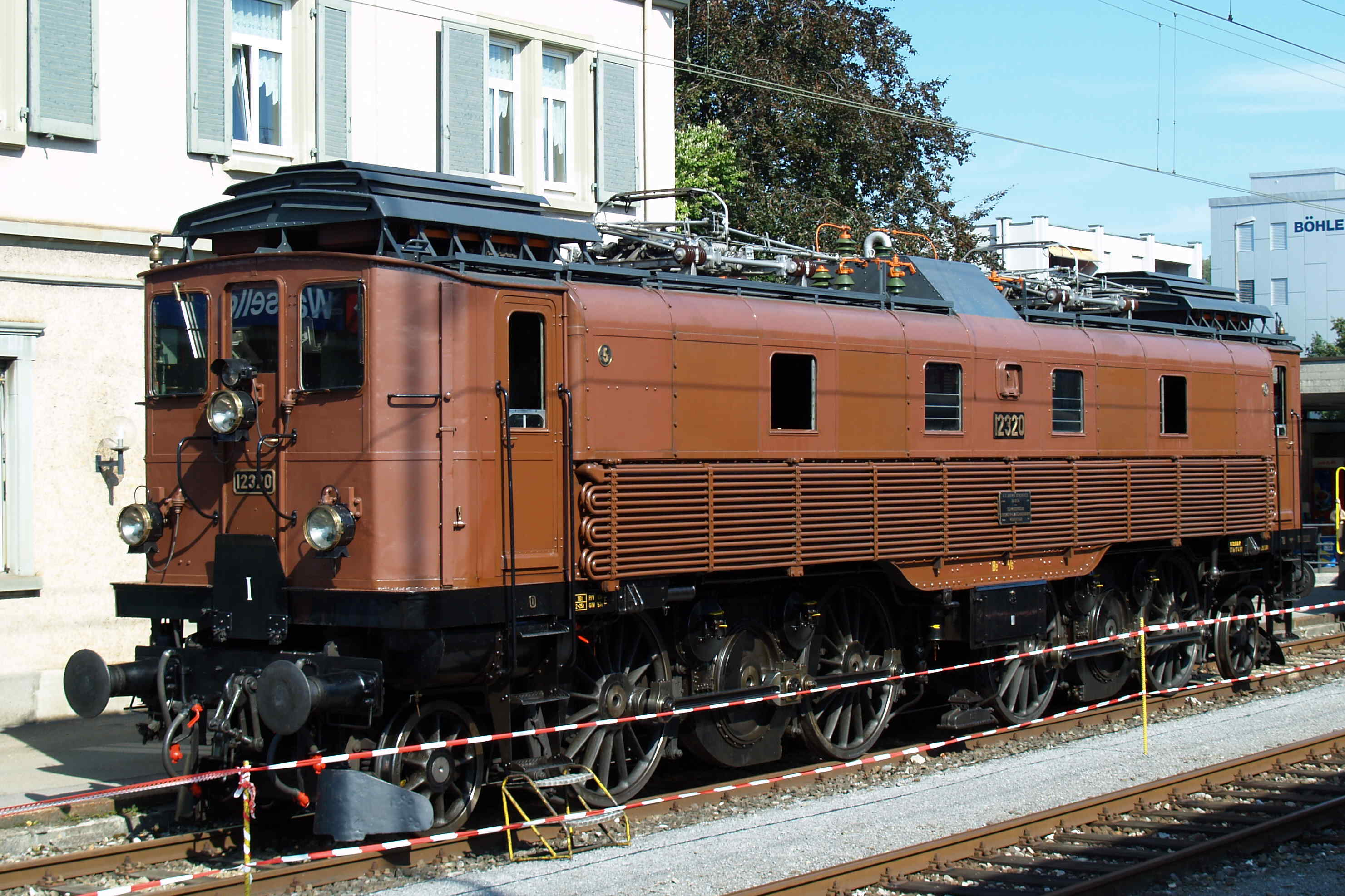
- Be 4/6 number 12320
Type and origin
- Power type: Electric
- Builder: Swiss Locomotive and Machine Works (SLM) (12303-12312); Brown, Boveri & Cie (BBC) (12313-12342)
- Order number: 40
- Build date: 1920-1923
- Total produced: 40
Specifications
- Configuration
  - UIC: (1′B)(B1′)
- Gauge: 1,435 mm (4 ft 8 1/2 in)
- Wheel diameter: 1,530 mm (5 ft 0 in)
- Trailing dia.: 950 mm (3 ft 1 in)
- Length: 16,500 mm (54 ft 2 in) over buffers
- Adhesive weight: 77 tonnes (12303-12312), 80 tonnes (12314-12342)
- Loco weight: 107 tonnes (12303-12312), 110 tonnes (12313-12342)
- Electric system/s: 15 kV 16.7 Hz AC Catenary
- Current pickup(s): Pantograph
- Traction motors: Four
- Transmission: Coupling rods between jackshaft and drivers in each bogie
- MU working: Available, together with Be 3/5, but not used See text
- Loco brake: Air; Railroad hand brake
- Train brakes: Air
Performance figures
- Maximum speed: 75 km/h (47 mph)
- Power output
  - 1 hour: 1,230 kW (1,650 hp) (12303-12312) or 1,500 kW (2,000 hp) (12313-12342) at 52 km/h (32 mph)
  - Continuous: 1,180 kW (1,580 hp) (12303-12312) or 1,310 kW (1,760 hp) (12313-12342) at 57 km/h (35 mph)
Career
- Operators: SBB
- Numbers: 12303-12342
- Delivered: 1 February 1920 to 9 April 1923
- Retired: 1965 - 1976
- Preserved: 3

The Be 4/6 was a bogie locomotive operated by the Schweizerischen Bundesbahnen (Swiss Federal Railways) (SBB) on the Gotthard Railway along with the Be 3/5, The design was based on the prototype Be 4/6 12302.

== Background ==
In November 1913 the SBB Board decided to electrify the Gotthard route from Erstfeld to Biasca, a decision supported by wartime experience. During the First World War, coal shortages curtailed many railway services to the extent that, by the autumn of 1918 on Sundays, with the exception of milk trains, no trains were running. Electrification was complete by 1920.

Four prototype locomotives were ordered, Be 3/5 12201, Be 4/6 12301, Be 4/6 12302 and Ce 6/8 14201. Before testing was complete, the Swiss Federal Railways placed orders in May 1918 with SLM and BBC on draft design proposals submitted for ten locomotives to be numbered 12303 to 12312. A follow-on order for 12313 to 12342 was placed in July the same year. An important criterion for the order was an even distribution of passenger and freight locomotives from the different companies.

== Specification ==
SBB required that the industry fulfill the following requirements:

- Maximum speed 75 km / h
- Transport 300 t load to 26 ‰ gradient at 50 km / h
- Safe start at 26 ‰ incline and accelerate the same load to 50 km / h in 4 minutes
- Three return trips Lucerne - Chiasso within 24 hours (1,360 km) each with 15 minutes stay in the end stations.

Between 23 and 24 September 1922, number 12328 was used to confirm the specification had been met. The test train with a weight of 302 tonnes (297 long tons; 333 short tons) was driven from Lucerne to Chiasso and back three times in 25 hours. After the second return trip, a one-hour stop was set up in Lucerne for precise checking and relubrication. The average speed was 62 kilometres per hour (39 miles per hour), with a pure driving time of 21 hours and 51 minutes, which was considerable for the time. On the 26 ‰ inclines, the train travelled at between 55 and 60 kilometres per hour (34 and 37 miles per hour). In a start-up test, the train could reach the required speed in 2½ instead of 4 minutes. The permissible temperatures were never exceeded during the entire test phase.

== Design ==
The design of the locomotive was derived from Be 4/6 12302, particularly the first batch, numbers 12303 to 12312. Traction was provided by two electric motors, one mounted in each bogie. The motors drove two drive axles. Each bogie also had an unpowered running axle. Wheels had between 2 and 70 millimetres (0.079 and 2.756 inches) play with the bogie frame.

Braking was by automatic Westinghouse brakes and regulating brakes fitted to the driving wheels. Rheostatic braking was fitted from 12313 onwards, which led to a more complicated braking sequence. To slow or stop the locomotive, the drive lever had to be returned to the "0" position and the reversing switch changed to Bremsen (Brakes). Only then could the driver lever be used in braking mode. In addition, the electric brake was comparatively weak. It was just enough to keep a lone locomotive on the Gotthard southern slope. Braking energy was dissipated via boxes on the roof. A handbrake was also fitted in each cab.

== Modifications ==
During their long life, the locomotives were modified a number of times.

- 1921 Locomotives 12311 and 12312 were equipped for multiple control.
- 1931 Safety controls were installed to allow for one-man operation.
- 1935 Lichttagessignal, a red lamp arranged above the middle headlamp, was installed. This allowed driving authorization to be displayed. As a result, no red disk needed to be placed on the headlamp.
- 1937 Train safety signs were added.
- 1940s 12303 to 12328 were equipped with small sun roofs above the driver's windows.
- 1950 Heating connections removed. Train heating subsequently only took place via the first car.
- 1953 Heating voltage rectification was removed, allowing operation only at 1000 V.
- 1954 Front doors were welded and transition plates removed.
- 1955 Heatable front windows on the driver's side were installed.
- 1956 12316 was fitted with series motors to improve braking.
- 1957 12331 was fitted with improved brakes for braking at low speed.
- 1960 The rod buffers were replaced by sleeve buffers.
- 1961 12314 to 12342 were fitted with improved brakes.

== Service ==
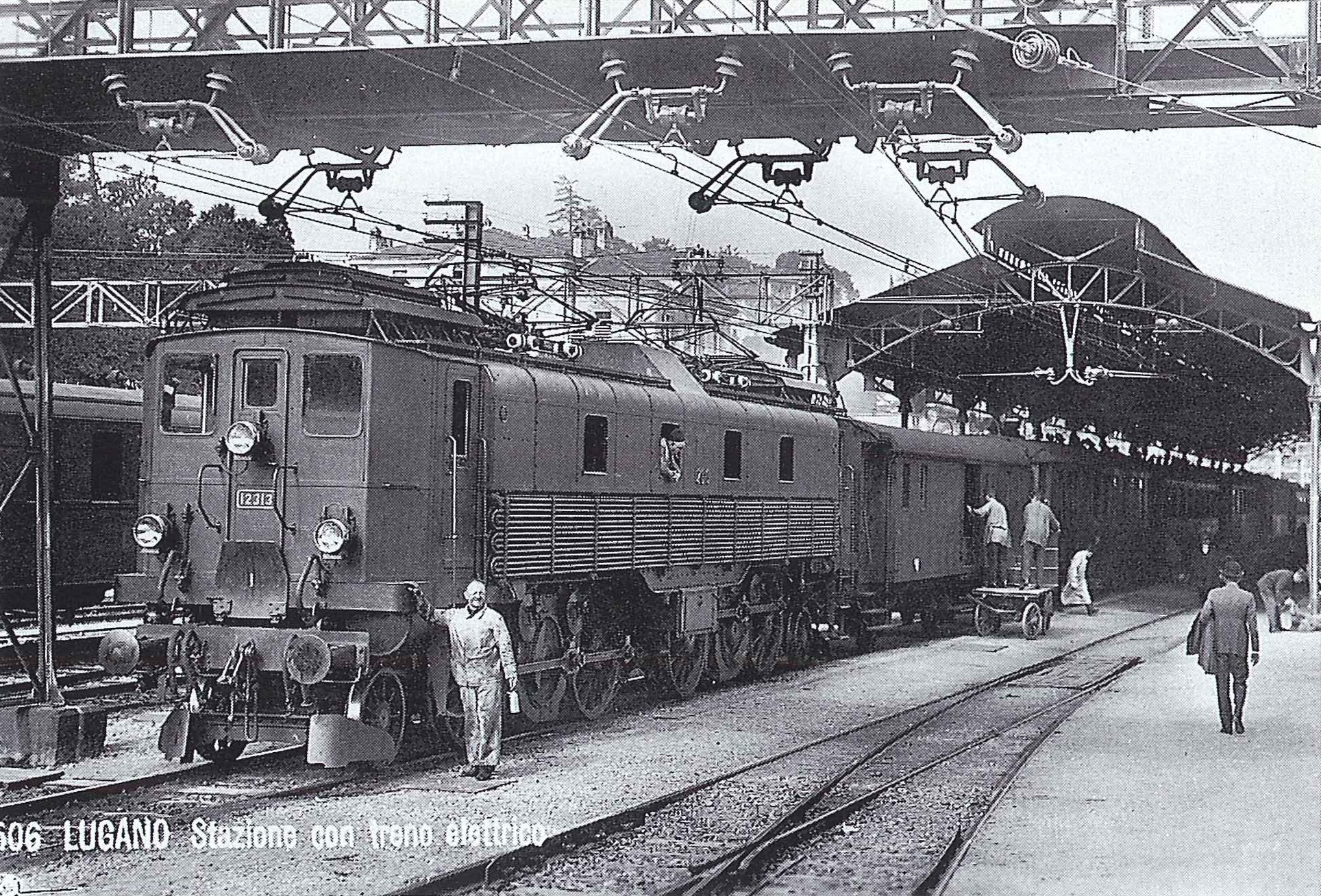
Be 4/6 12313 in Lugano, 1925

The first locomotive (12303) was delivered on 1 February 1920 and the last (12342) on 9 April 1923.

Between 1 February and 30 June 1920, the first series (12303-12312) were put into operation from the Bern depot. They had first proved themselves between Lötschbergbahn and Brig-Glis. 12303-12307 were transferred to Erstfeld in early summer 1920 to test for trial the first electrified section of Erstfeld-Göschenen, returning to Bern between August 1921 and January 1922. In 1924, the entire first series without electric brake (12303-12312) was assigned to the Zürich depot. With the exception of the 12303, which spent 1929-1947 and 1950–1955 in Bern, they remained based in Zürich until 1962, when they were allotted to the Winterthur depot until they were phased out.

Locomotives 12313-12316 were delivered to Bern from 12 January 1921 to 19 July 1921, and were then transferred to Erstfeld. Locomotives 12317-12342 were delivered directly to the Gotthard between April 1921 and April 1923 and distributed to Erstfeld and Bellinzona. The depot in Lucerne received 12313–12340 in 1924, some moving to Olten in November 1927. The Zürich depot was given 12313 and 12314 in 1928 and 1929 and further movements happened as needs changed. Sample distributions are as follows:

Depot	1928 allocation	1938 allocation	1957 allocation	1963 allocation
Bellinzona	12325–12332	12323–12328	12331–12342	
Bern		12303		
Biel/Bienne			12321–12325	12323–12334
Erstfeld	12333–12342	12329–12342		
Luzern	12314–12318	12320–12322	12326–12330	12335–12342
Olten	12319–12324	12315-12319		
Winterthur				12303–12322
Zürich	12303–12313	12304–12314	12303–12320	

The Be 4/6 pulled all major express trains on the lines they served, including those between Schaffhausen and Zürich, until 1929 when the Ae 4/7 started replacing them. By 1938, the type had been largely replaced by Ae 4/7 and Ae 8/14 in express service in Gotthard, finally disappearing in 1962 with the increasing introduction of the Ae 6/6.

Freight was also pulled, particularly from the depot at Olten, which served Basel and Zürich for decades. By 1955, the movement of locomotives to Biel/Bienne was part of a general trend moving the locomotives to the lowlands. However, they required an ever-increasing amount of repair and maintenance, and retirement started in April 1965 with 12312, with the last locomotive number 12339 discarded in February 1976.

== Preservation ==
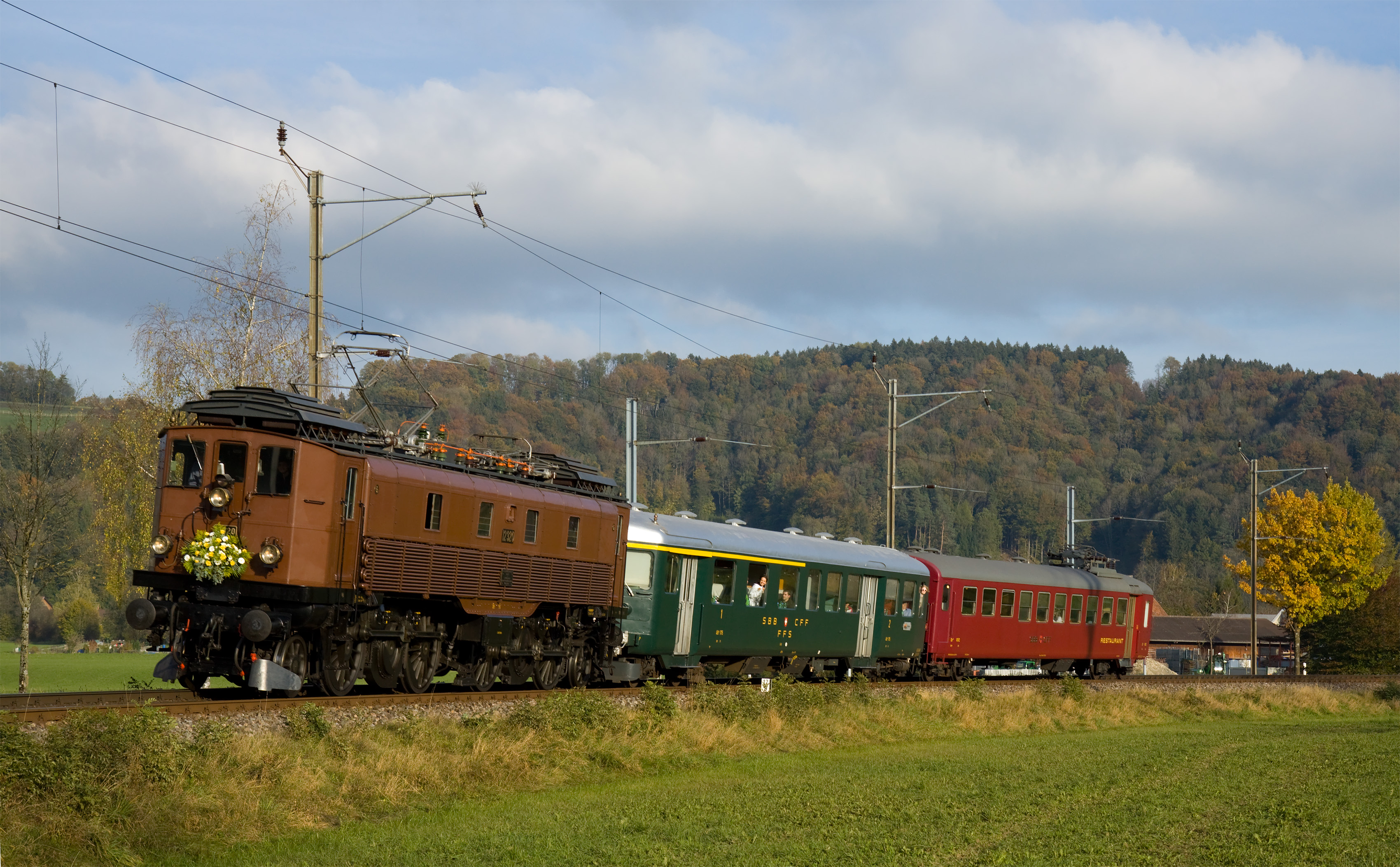
Be 4/6 12320 travelling between Rämismühle-Zell and Rikon in 2009

Three machines have been preserved:

- Be 4/6 12332 was moved to the Swiss Museum of Transport in Lucerne in 1982.
- Be 4/6 12339 was presented to Italy in February 1976 in exchange for a three-phase locomotive, but returned to Switzerland on 18 April 2010 and is managed by the club Swisstrain.
- Be 4/6 12320 was restored on 25 July 1975 to its original external state and painted in original red-brown paint, and is based at Winterthur.

== See also ==
- Swiss locomotive and railcar classification
- SBB Historic
