= SBB Be 4/6 12301 =

1919 Swiss electric locomotive

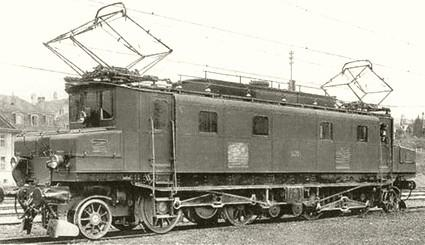
- Be 4/6 12301 in the 1930s
Type and origin
- Power type: Electric
- Builder: Maschinenfabrik Oerlikon (MFO)
- Build date: 1919
- Total produced: 1
Specifications
- Configuration
  - UIC: (1’B)+(B1’)
- Gauge: 1,435 mm (4 ft 8 1/2 in)
- Wheel diameter: 1,350 mm (4 ft 5 in)
- Trailing dia.: 950 mm (3 ft 1 in)
- Length: 16,200 mm (53 ft 2 in) over buffers
- Adhesive weight: 78 tonnes (77 long tons; 86 short tons)
- Loco weight: 107 tonnes (105 long tons; 118 short tons)
- Electric system/s: 15 kV 16.7 Hz AC Catenary
- Current pickup: Pantograph
- Traction motors: Four
- Transmission: Slit coupling rod between motor and drivers in each bogie
- MU working: Not available
- Loco brake: Air; Railroad hand brake
- Train brakes: Air
Performance figures
- Maximum speed: 75 km/h (47 mph)
- Power output
  - 1 hour: 1,700 kW (2,300 hp) at 59 km/h (37 mph)
  - Continuous: 1,570 kW (2,110 hp) at 63 km/h (39 mph)
Career
- Operators: SBB
- Numbers: 12301
- Nicknames: Doryphore
- Delivered: 21 March 1919
- First run: April 1919
- Last run: 7 March 1963
- Retired: 7 March 1963
- Withdrawn: 7 March 1963
- Preserved: None
- Scrapped: August 1963

The Be 4/6 12301 was a locomotive ordered by Schweizerische Bundesbahnen (SBB, Swiss Federal Railways) in June 1917 to test the electrification of the Gotthard railway. It was one of four test units ordered.

It was used for passenger and freight services from 1919 to 1937, and was destroyed in a fire in 1963.

== History ==
In November 1913, the SBB executive board decided to electrify the Gotthard railway from Erstfeld to Biasca. Coal shortages in the wake of World War I limited SBB train schedules; by the autumn of 1918, only milk trains were running on Sundays. Electrification was completed in 1920, and SBB was in urgent need of passenger and freight locomotives to run on the newly electrified line.

The SBB demanded manufacturers' compliance with the following requirements:

- Top speed of 75 km/h
- Haulage of towed load of 300 t at a gradient of 26‰ with 50 km/h
- Reliable run-up with this load at a gradient of 26‰ and acceleration to 50 km/h within 4 minutes
- Three outward and return journeys between Arth-Goldau and Chiasso within 24 hours (1360 km)
- Electrical brake for deceleration of the locomotive weight at slopes
- Multiple-unit control

The contract was awarded to Maschinenfabrik Oerlikon (MFO) for the electrical design and construction of the passenger locomotive, and Swiss Locomotive and Machine Works (SLM) for the mechanical design and construction. Aside from compliance with the required specifications, the manufacturers had considerable design freedom.

=== Service ===
The Be 4/6 12301 was delivered on 21 March 1919 as the first of four test locomotives, the others being the Be 3/5 12201, Be 4/6 12302 and Ce 6/8^{I}14201. One month later, it was already in service for training locomotive personnel.

Training runs were undertaken almost immediately in the region around Bern, revealing a host of teething issues (including with the electrical brake) that prevented the Be 4/6 12301 from being used for scheduled services. However, it was well liked by drivers due to its smooth handling, even at top speed. On 1 September 1919, the locomotive was officially put into service by the SBB as a commuter train to Spiez and partially to Brig. After a break in 1920, the Be 4/6 12301 resumed service together with the Be 4/6 12303-12342 – which was in the delivery phase – on the Lötschberg railway line until Brig. It was soon obvious that the Be 4/6 12301 would never be used for its initially planned services on the Gotthard line. On 31 May 1921, the locomotive ran its last planned passenger service on the Lötschberg line. Thereafter, it led freight trains from Bern to Basel and Biel.

From 1937, the locomotive was assigned to the marshalling yard of Lausanne. Its duty was the pulling of freight trains which had to be distributed to the yard's hump. On 1 January 1962, the Be 4/6 12301 was assigned to the Yverdon shop to reduce the cost of servicing at the main Bellinzona shop.

=== Destruction ===
In 1963, a short circuit caused a transformer explosion, causing a fire that completely burned the locomotive down, as the fire brigade was not able to extinguish the fire in time. That August, the remains of the locomotive were scrapped at Bellinzona.

== Technical details ==
=== Running gear ===
The running gear consisted of two bogies. In each bogie were two drive axles, one idle axle in a Bissel truck, and a jackshaft. The idle axles had lateral play of 70 mm in either direction relative to the bogie frame.

Two motors were mounted in each bogie frame, driving large gears over pinions sprung on both sides. The large gears were connected to a jackshaft, which drove a slit coupling rod connected to the crank pins of the two drive axles.

Tractive force was transmitted from the drive axles to the bogie, then carried over to the bogie-mounted towing hook and buffers. In between the bogies was a so-called tender coupling consisting of one main rod and two auxiliary rods. The locomotive body was not engaged in the transmission of tractive force.

The automatic air brake and the locomotive brake acted via a separate brake cylinder on both sides of each drive axle. The idle wheels did not have brakes. Each cab was equipped with a handbrake which acted on the respective bogie.

=== Body ===
The locomotive body consisted of a single bridging slab to which the rest of the body was bolted. The bridging slab laid on the bogies via pivots located under the cabs. Besides the pivots, two spring-loaded bearings were mounted at the outer parts of the body. Additional roller bearings were located in the body behind the motors.

At either end outside of each cab, electrical cabinets were mounted over the bogies, separated by a center gangway. This gangway, consisting of a crossover plate and the front door, was considered necessary to access the locomotive from the rest of the train at that time. For motor ventilation, two pneumatically controlled blinds were mounted on both sides of the body, operable from both cabs.

=== Electrical systems ===
Two diamond-shaped pantographs, controllable with a valve in each cab, led power from the overhead line to an oil-cooled transformer over a lightning protection inductor and the oil-driven main switch. The transformer was located in the center of the locomotive body and was switchable to either 15,000 V or 7,500 V. This arrangement was necessary, since the Gotthard railway line was initially only supplied with 7500 V owing to regular steam locomotive operation. The SBB considered that the carbon black on the insulators of the overhead line could lead to shortcuts when a very high voltage was used. The low-voltage side of the transformer was divided into two parts and equipped with 11 taps. The two camshaft switches were mounted longitudinally on either side of the transformer.

It was possible, as with the Be 3/5 12201, to select 23 steps, with the locomotive driver turning one of two vertical crank handles once for each step. It was possible to shut off power by turning both switches down with a special handle. If one step switch failed, it could be separated, with it being possible to use the remaining switch's available steps. Four pneumatic reverse switches were placed on the motors, connected in parallel.

The electrical brake was tested in June 1919 on the Lötschberg line. It was subsequently removed as it was considered too unreliable. The locomotive was equipped with multiple-unit control, which was never tested.

The locomotive consisted of the subsequent listed auxiliary systems operated with 220 V:

- two piston compressors in the left cabinet at either end
- a roof fan to cool the transformer shaft
- two fans to cool the motors
- one motor-generator for battery charging in the front right cabinet

A cab heating system was fed from a separate oil-driven 1000 V main switch.
