= Erstfeld =

- Municipality
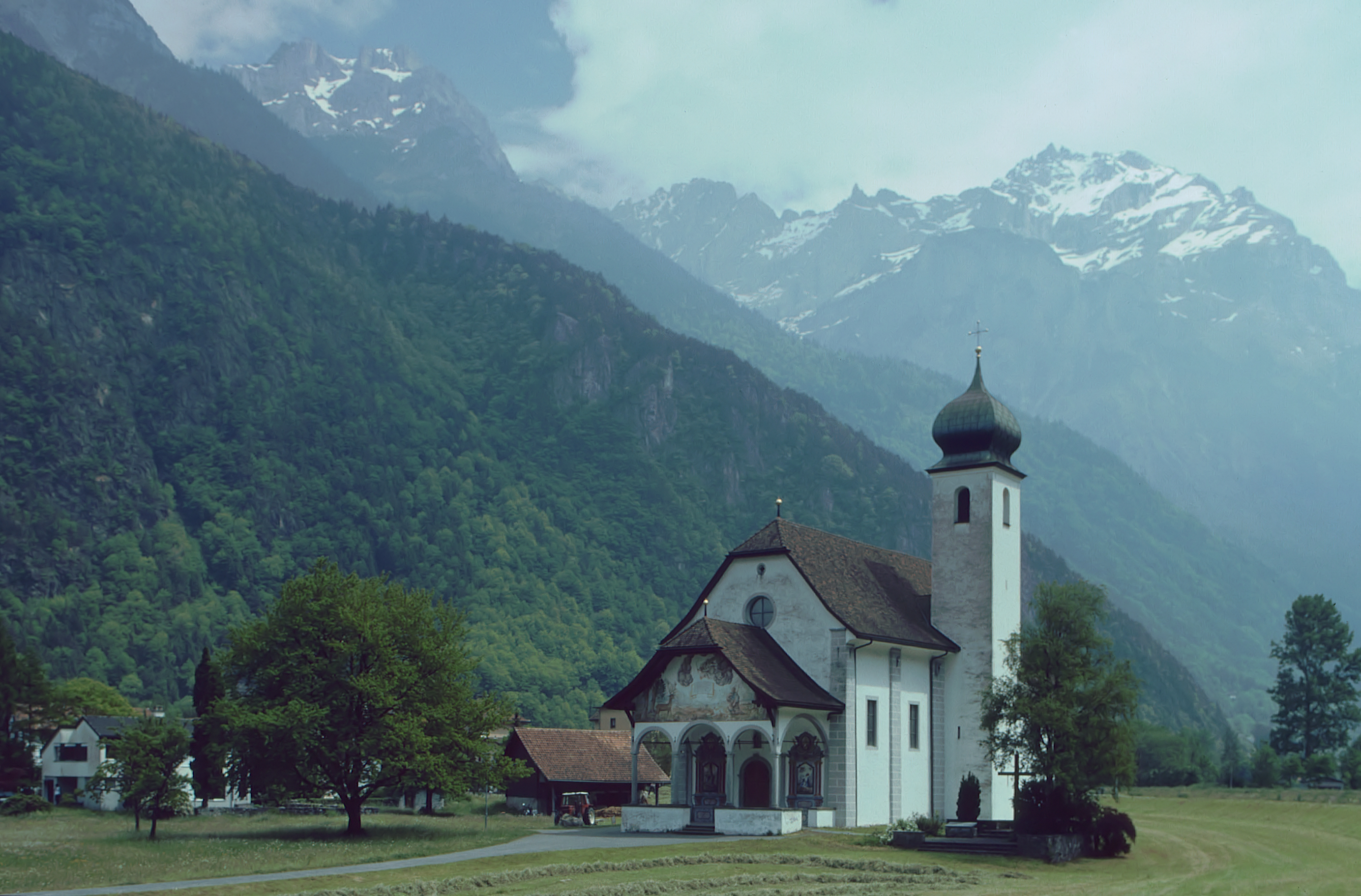

- Flag Coat of arms
- Location of Erstfeld
- Location within Switzerland Location within Canton of Uri
- Coordinates: 46°49′N 8°39′E
- Country: Switzerland
- Canton: Uri
- District: n.a.

Area
  - Total: 59.20 km^{2} (22.86 sq mi)
- Elevation: 475 m (1,558 ft)

Population (December 2020)
  - Total: 3,861
  - Density: 65.22/km^{2} (168.9/sq mi)
- Time zone: UTC+01:00 (CET)
  - Summer (DST): UTC+02:00 (CEST)
- Postal code: 6472
- SFOS number: 1206
- ISO 3166 code: CH-UR
- Surrounded by: Attinghausen, Gurtnellen, Schattdorf, Silenen, Wassen
- Website: www.erstfeld.ch

Erstfeld is a municipality in the canton of Uri in Switzerland.

== History ==
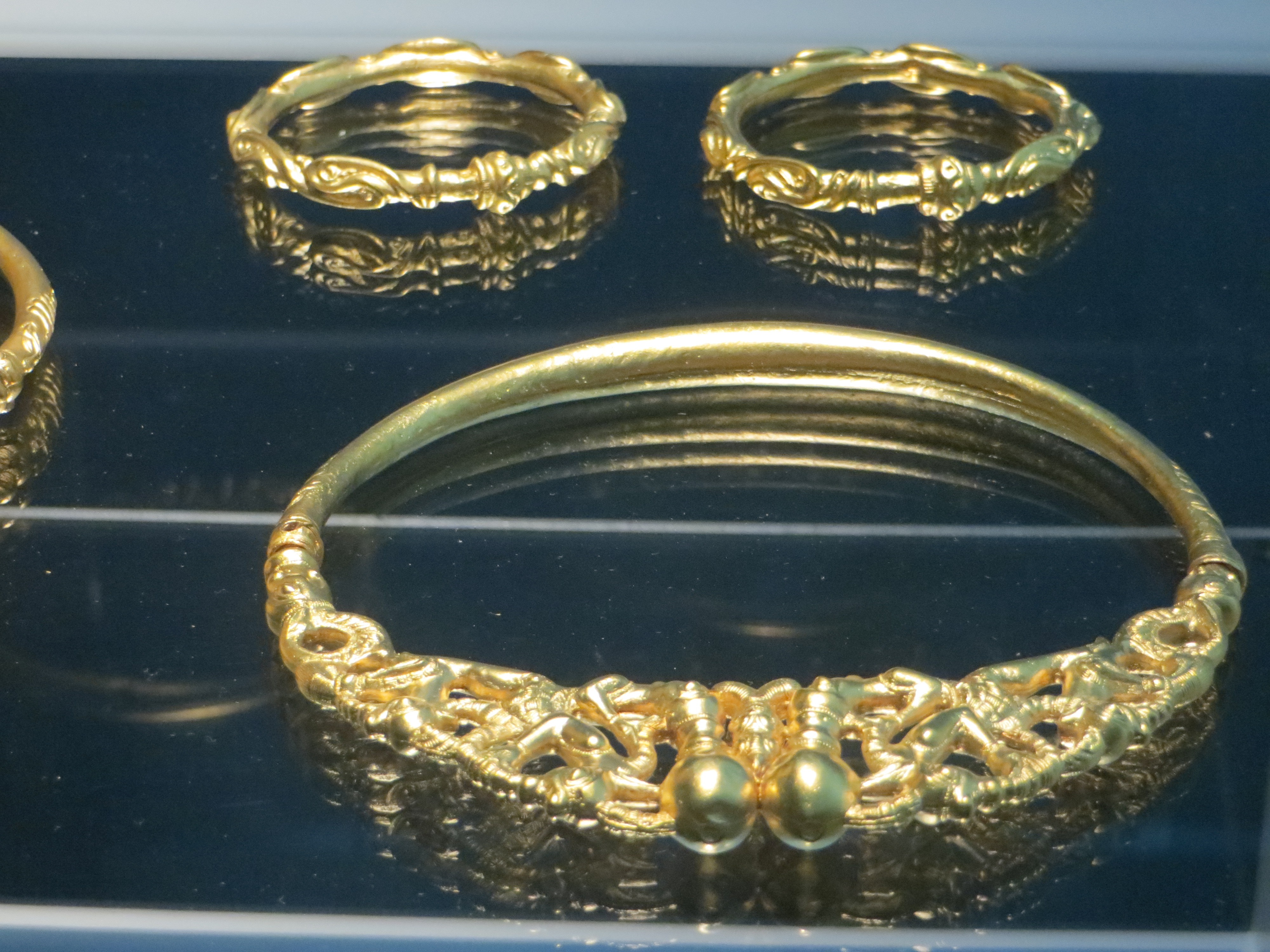
A hoard of torques found in Erstfeld can be seen in the Swiss National Museum in Zurich

In 1962 a collection of four gold torques and three gold arm rings were discovered near Erstfeld. While the exact origin date is unknown, they are likely from the 4th century BC. The nearly pure gold rings were discovered under 9 meters (30 ft) of land slide debris. The rings show Celtic motifs and designs and display a high level of skill. While their purpose is unknown, one theory is that they were offerings made to celebrate safely crossing the Alps.

Erstfeld is first mentioned in 1258 as Ourzcvelt. In 1638, it was listed under the Latin name in Protocampis. In 1831, it was known as Hirschfelden.

== Geography ==
Erstfeld has an area, as of 2006, of 59.2 km^{2} (22.9 sq mi). Of this area, 11.7% is used for agricultural purposes, while 29.2% is forested. Of the rest of the land, 2.8% is settled (buildings or roads) and the remainder (56.2%) is non-productive (rivers, glaciers or mountains). In the 1993/97 land survey, 19.8% of the total land area was heavily forested, while 7.9% is covered in small trees and shrubbery. Of the agricultural land, 0.2% is used for farming or pastures, while 5.3% is used for orchards or vine crops and 6.3% is used for alpine pastures. Of the settled areas, 1.2% is covered with buildings, 0.3% is industrial, 0.1% is listed as parks and greenbelts and 1.2% is transportation infrastructure. Of the unproductive areas, 0.1% is unproductive standing water (ponds or lakes), 0.9% is unproductive flowing water (rivers), 41.8% is too rocky for vegetation, and 13.3% is other unproductive land.

The municipality consists of the linear village of Erstfeld and scattered farm houses along the valley floor and up the mountain sides.

Erstfeld is at the base of the northern ramp of the Gotthard railway and houses all the rolling stock needed for the rail line.

== Population ==
Historical population
Year	Pop.	±%
1743	614	—
1799	700	+14.0%
1850	916	+30.9%
1880	1,184	+29.3%
1900	2,416	+104.1%
1910	3,149	+30.3%
1950	3,747	+19.0%
1970	4,516	+20.5%
2000	3,933	−12.9%
2005	3,778	−3.9%
2007	3,715	−1.7%

Erstfeld has a population (as of 31 December 2020) of 3,861. As of 2007, 13.3% of the population was made up of foreign nationals. Over the last 10 years, the population has decreased at a rate of -10.8%. Most of the population (as of 2000) speaks German (88.7%), with Serbo-Croatian being second most common (3.7%), and Italian being third (2.4%). As of 2007, the gender distribution of the population was 50.6% male and 49.4% female.

In Erstfeld, about 60.8% of the population (between age 25–64) have completed either non-mandatory upper secondary education or additional higher education (either university or a Fachhochschule).

Erstfeld has an unemployment rate of 1.94%. As of 2005, there were 119 people employed in the primary economic sector and about 47 businesses involved in this sector. About 643 people are employed in the secondary sector, and there are 38 businesses in this sector. About 870 people are employed in the tertiary sector, with 86 businesses in this sector.

== Transport ==
Erstfeld is served by the Erstfeld station, situated within the municipality and on the Gotthard railway.

== Notable residents ==
- Emilie Lieberherr (1924–2011), a feminist
- Albert Eschenmoser (1925–2023), an organic chemist
