= SBB RBe 540 =

Swiss electric multiple unit railcar

SBB RBe 4/4
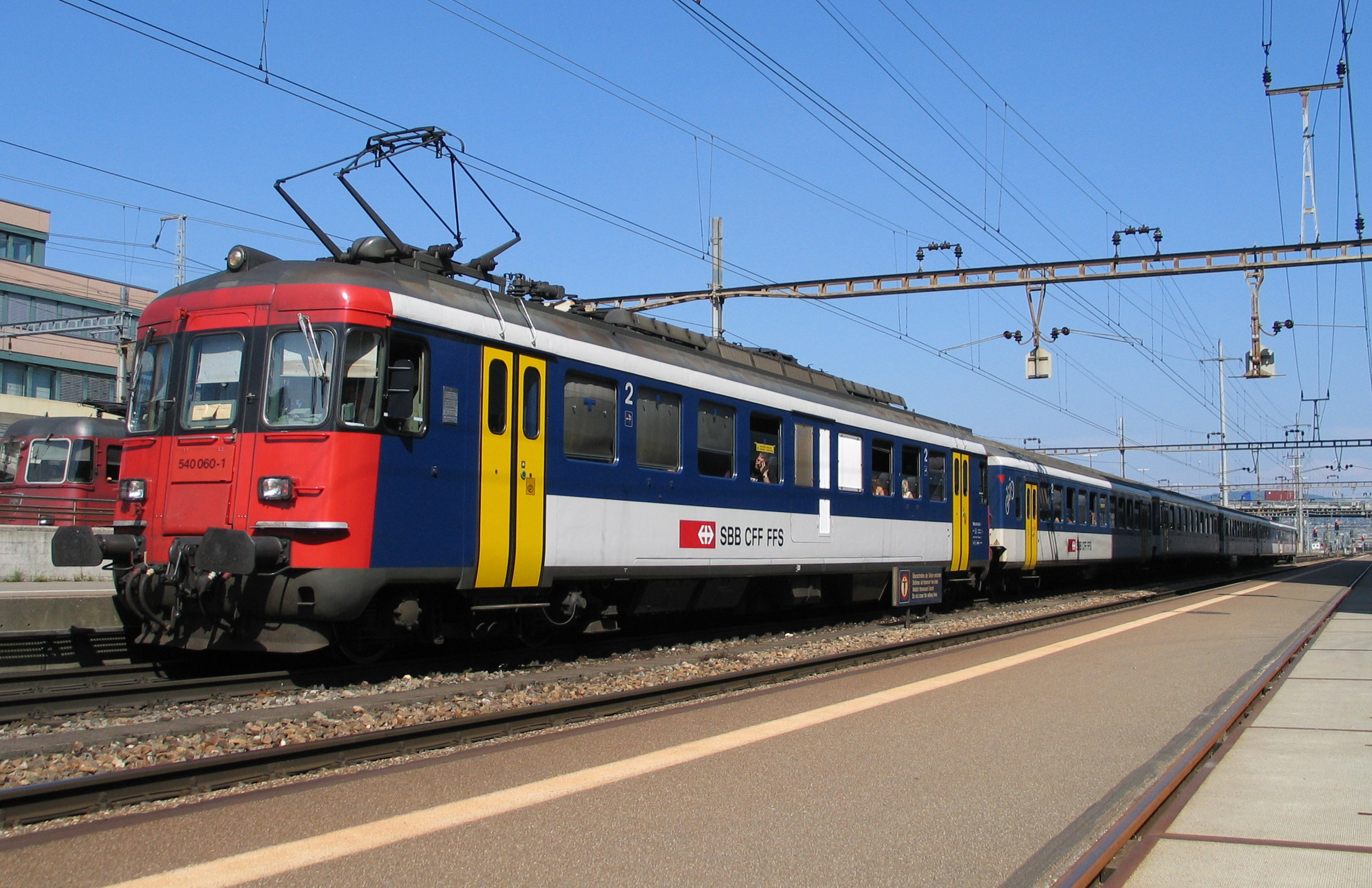
- Modernized motor coach RBe 4/4 as RBe 540
Type and origin
- Power type: Electric
- Builder: SIG Neuhausen; BBC Baden; MFO Zürich
- Build date: 1959–1960, 1963–1966
- Total produced: 82
- Rebuild date: 1993–1998 (R4)
Specifications
- Configuration
  - UIC: Bo'Bo'
- Gauge: 1,435 mm (4 ft 8 1/2 in) standard gauge
- Length: 23,700 mm (77 ft 9 1/8 in)
- Loco weight: 68 t (67 long tons; 75 short tons); after R4: 72 t (71 long tons; 79 short tons); Prototypes: 64 t (63 long tons; 71 short tons)
- Electric system/s: 15 kV 16.7 Hz AC Catenary
- Current pickup: Pantograph
Performance figures
- Maximum speed: 125 km/h (78 mph)
- Power output: 1,988 kW (2,666 hp)
- Tractive effort: 89 kN (20,000 lb_{f}) (continuous); 167 kN (38,000 lb_{f}) (maximum)
Career
- Numbers: 1401–1482
- Preserved: 78

Starting in 1959, the SBB motor coach of the type RBe 4/4 (current designation RBe 540) was introduced as a replacement for the old SBB electric locomotives Ae 3/5, Ae 3/6 I, Ae 3/6 II and Ae 3/6 III with three driving axles. As a consequence, they had much power at their disposal, even more than the Re 4/4 I locomotives, a regenerative brake, cabs on both ends with doors to passenger carriages as well as multiple unit (SBB Vst IIId type) or driving trailer control. The original motor coaches had 64 seats, 32 smoking and 32 non-smoking, and were painted in ordinary SBB green.

The first six prototypes, each costing one million Swiss francs, were delivered 1959 and 1960, and first shown to the press at 24 May 1959. The prototypes had some issues which were fixed prior to production of the series. The production units were four tonnes heavier. 76 units were ordered and put into service between 1963 and 1966.

Most of the technical equipment is installed below the passenger compartment, leading to a higher than usual floor level than ordinary carriages had. Some of the equipment and the toilet is installed in the middle of the multiple unit, instead of passenger compartments. The conventional transformer technology with its rough step controller (28 running notches) together with occasional heavy vibrations led to the nickname "Schüttelbecher" ("shaker").

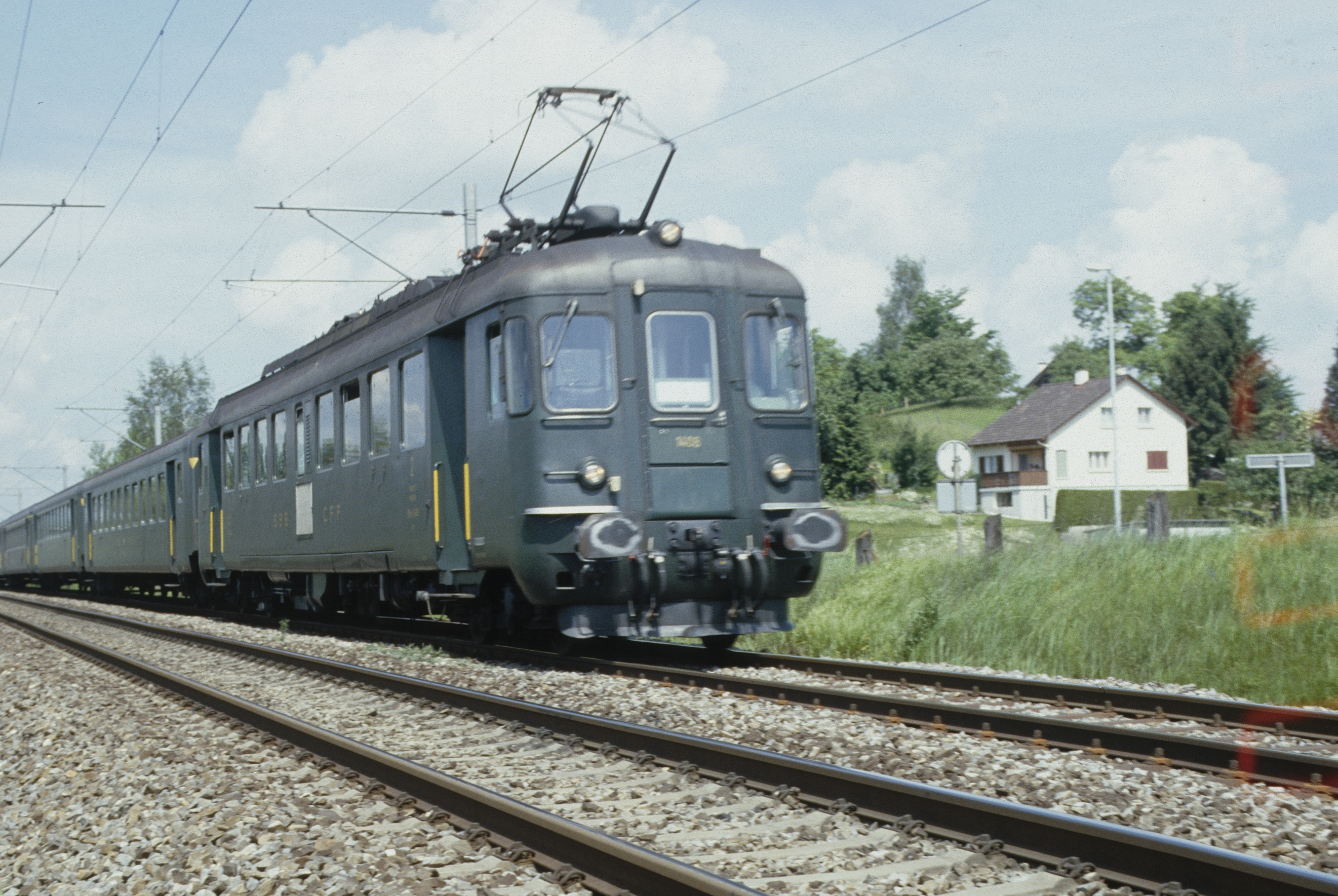
SBB RBe 4/4 in 1983

Starting in 1992, all units (except for the prototypes) were modernized to fit the needs of S-Bahn operations. This included cloth seats instead of the plastic ones and some other interior modifications, NPZ livery, automatic doors for conductor-less operation as well as the installation of an additional thyristor controller, for which a passenger compartment had to be given up. The latter improved running smoothness considerably, especially when using the regenerative brake. At the same time, they were renumbered to the UIC scheme, which led to some inconsistencies due to vehicles already retired from service:

- RBe 540 006–4 to 540 017-1: Former units 1407 - 1418
- RBe 540 018–9 to 540 051-0: Former units 1420 - 1453
- RBe 540 052–8 to 540 079-1: Former units 1455 - 1482

The prototypes, which never got UIC numbers, got the nicknames "Seetal-RBe 4/4", due to their special warning livery for services on the dangerous Seetalbahn.

So far, the prototypes 1401-1403 (due to old age), 1419 (accident in St.-Triphon), 1454 (fire between Uster and Aatal in 1990), 540 008 (fire between Safenwil and Walterswil-Striegel, 1998) and 540 023 (fire at Eglisau, 2000) were discarded. RBe 540 019 was sold to the Oensingen-Balsthal Bahn.

== Operation ==
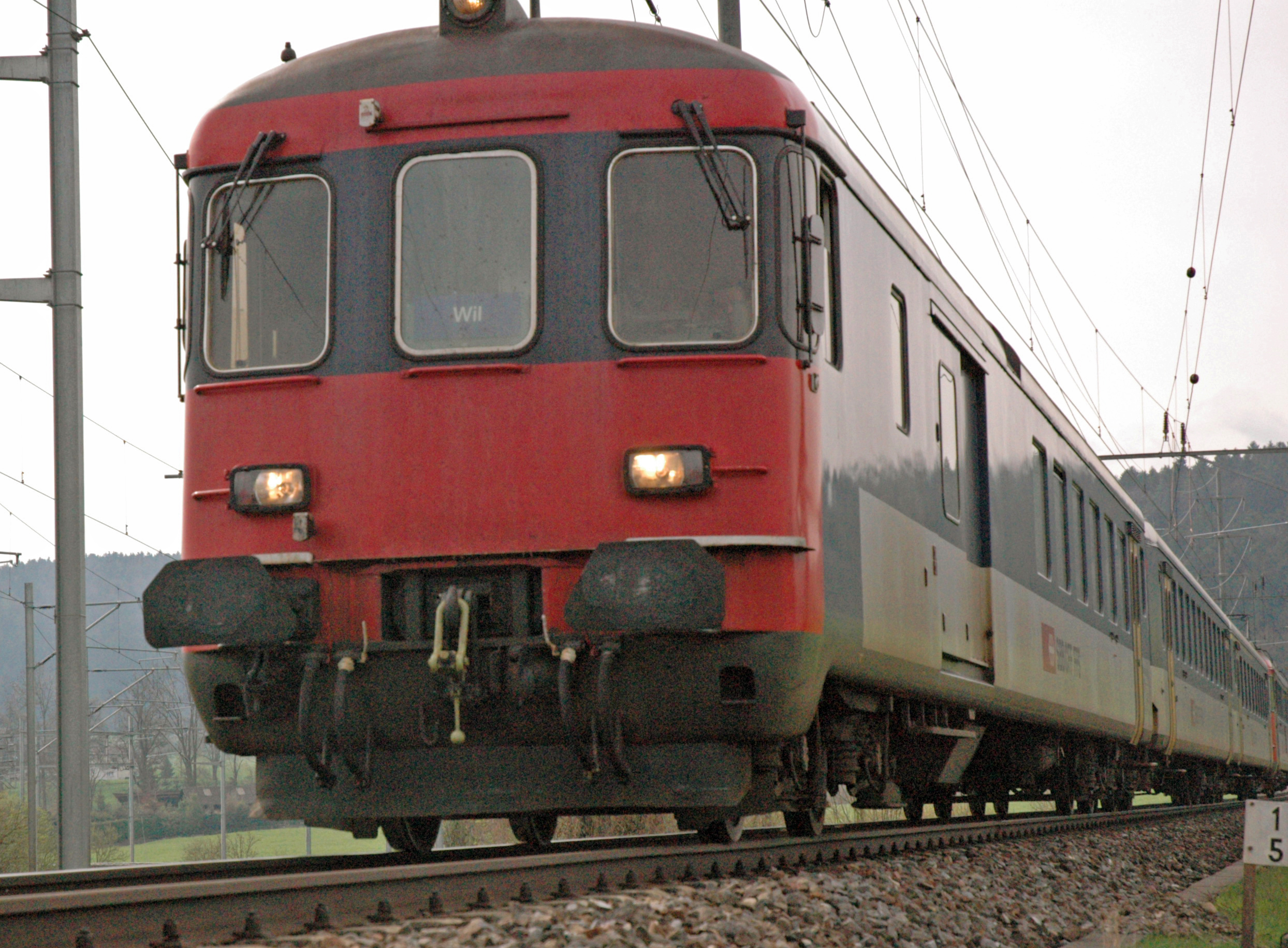
Driving trailer type BDt (Wil-Wattwil)

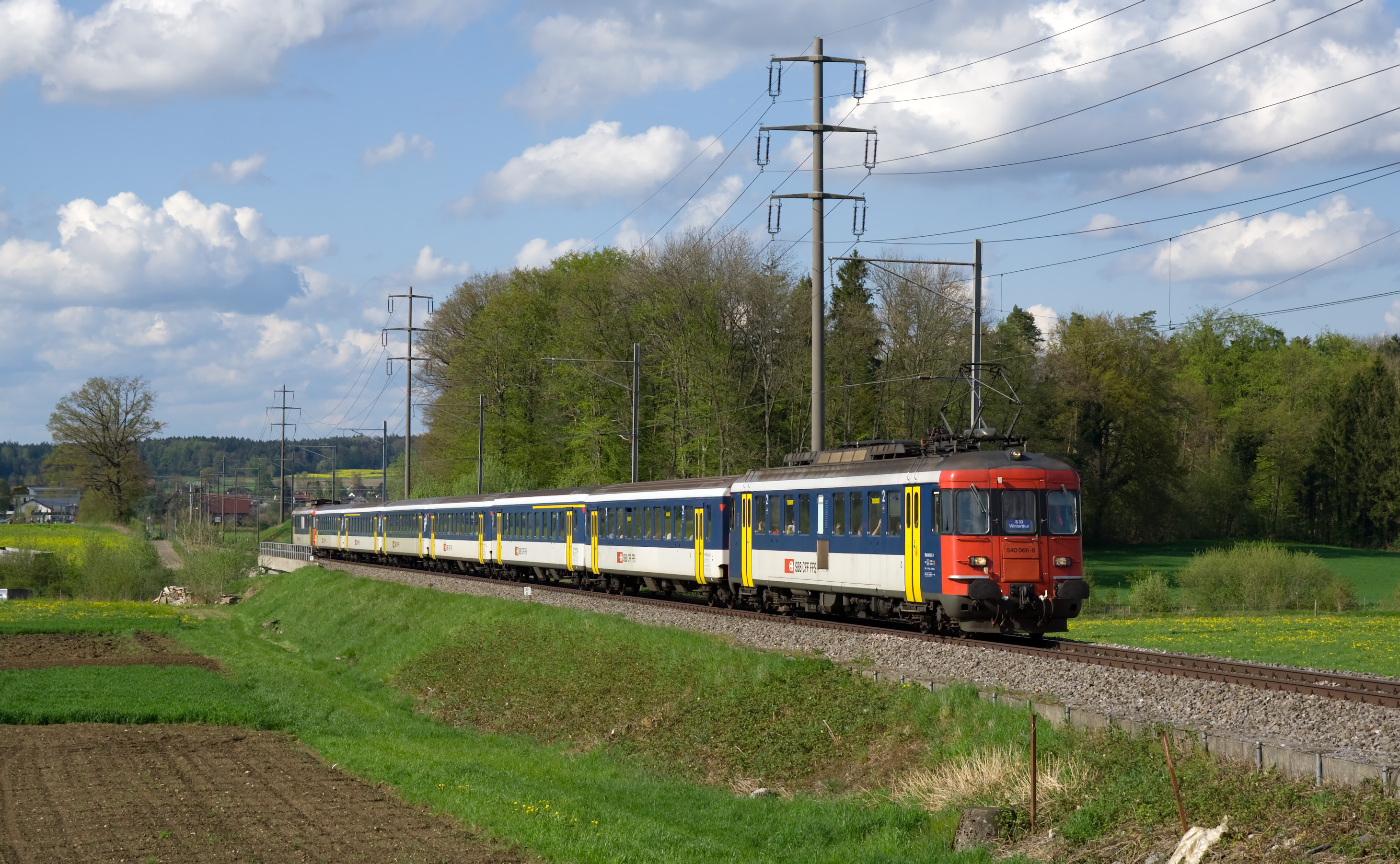
To save control cars and to have more power, S-Bahn trains are often run by two RBe 540 with the train sandwiched in between

The RBe 540 are usually used together with one or more Einheitswagen ("standard coaches") I or II as well as a control car BDt or Bt for commuter service. Together with their modernization, the EW I/II and control cars were also modernized to match the new livery. Nowadays, these consists serve regional lines with low passenger frequencies and supplement services normally run by NPZ consists, but are progressively replaced by the modern Stadler GTW. On the S-Bahn Zurich network, special consists can be seen, consisting of two RBe 540 on the front and back of the train with six modernized EW I or II in between, which avoids the pointless use of control cars, because shorter consists couldn't provide enough capacity anyway and a single multiple unit would not be able to deliver enough acceleration for S-Bahn operation. The free control cars are used together with EW I/II and Re 4/4^{II} locomotives to create more push–pull trains.

Some RBe 540 rented from Thurbo were also used by the S-Bahn St. Gallen until 2005, together with an EW AB and a BDt.

It also happens during wintertime that RBe 540 have to replace the newer RBDe 560 multiple units, often due to issues with the doors; then one can see RBe 540 multiple units together with NPZ control cars, living up to the joke about the name NPZ (NPZ = Nichts Passt Zusammen = "nothing fits together").

== See also ==
- List of stock used by Swiss Federal Railways

== Bibliography ==
- Paul Winter (1959) SBB-Fibeln - Heft 1, Unsere Triebfahrzeuge. Orell Füssli Verlag, Zürich
- Paul Winter (1948) SBB-Fibeln – Heft 5, Unsere Wagen. Orell Füssli Verlag, Zürich
- Reto Danuser und Hans Streiff (2011) Die elektrischen und Dieseltriebfahrzeuge der SBB (Teil 2), Konstruktionsjahre 1952-1975, Minirex, Luzern, ISBN 978-3-907014-36-3.
