= SBB RBDe 560 =

Swiss push-pull commuter trainset

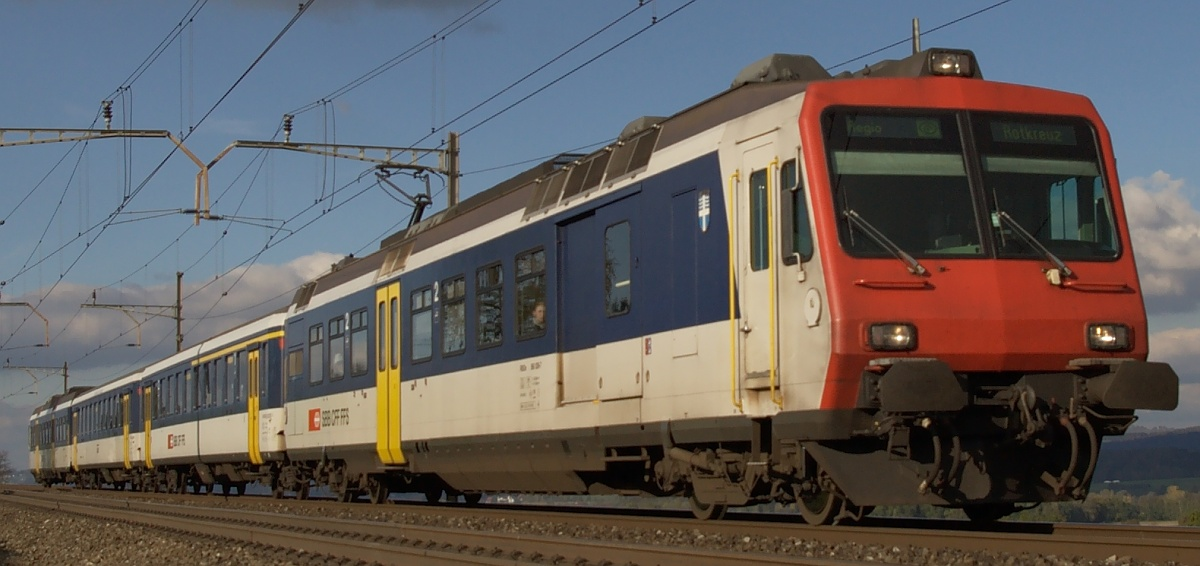
- RBDe 560 between Mühlau and Sins
- In service: 1984–present
- Manufacturer: Prototypes: FFA Altenrhein, BBC Baden; Main series: Schindler Waggon Altenrhein, BBC Baden / ABB Zürich, SIG Neuhausen; Derivatives: Schindler Waggon Pratteln, ABB Zürich / Adtranz Zürich, SIG Neuhausen
- Constructed: Prototypes: 1984; 1st series: 1987-1990; 2nd series: 1994-1996; RBDe 562: 1997 (conversion from RBDe 560); RBDe 561: 2003 (conversion from RBDe 560)
- Refurbished: 2006-2013
- Number built: 84 + 2 (1st series); 42 (2nd series); Total: 126 + 2
- Predecessor: Ae 3/6; Ae 4/7; Re 4/4^{I} BDe 4/4; RBe 540
- Successor: Stadler GTW; Stadler FLIRT
- Fleet numbers: RBDe 560: 2100–2185; RBDe 560 (UIC): RBDe 560 000–083; RBDe 560 (Chemin de fer Pont-Brassus): PBr RBDe 568 384–85; RBDe 562: RBDe 562 000–005; RBDe 561: RBDe 561 000–005; See text for more detail
- Capacity: 56 (all second class)
- Lines served: RBDe 560: Regional and S-Bahn traffic RBDe 562: Basel S-Bahn (SNCF); RBDe 561: Basel S-Bahn (Wiesental)

Specifications
- Car length: 25,000 mm (82 ft 0.3 in) (over buffers)
- Wheel diameter: 950 mm (3 ft)
- Maximum speed: 140 km/h (87 mph)
- Weight: RBDe 560/561: 70 t (68.9 long tons; 77.2 short tons); RBDe 562: 72 t (70.9 long tons; 79.4 short tons)
- Power output: 1,650 kW (2,210 hp) at 75 km/h (47 mph)
- Tractive effort: 78 kN (18,000 lb_{f}) (continuous); 182 kN (41,000 lb_{f}) (maximum)
- Electric system(s): 15 kV 16.7 Hz AC
- Current collector(s): Pantograph
- UIC classification: Bo'Bo'
- AAR wheel arrangement: Bo-Bo
- Track gauge: 1,435 mm (4 ft 8 1/2 in) standard gauge

Notes/references
- First equipment painted in SBB's current regional traffic color scheme (NPZ/Kolibri)

The RBDe 560 (in the old naming style, the RBDe 4/4) and its derivatives provide motive power for S-Bahn, suburban, and regional traffic on the Swiss Federal Railways (SBB) network. The derivative versions belong to the SBB as well as various private railroads. The locomotive and its matching Bt model Steuerwagen (translation: control car/cab car/driving trailer) form compositions generally known as the Neuer Pendelzug (New Push-pull Train), which is the source of the acronym NPZ. An NPZ trainset usually includes one or more intermediate cars.

== General information ==
In 1984 four pre-series sets (each consisting of a motor car and a driving trailer) were delivered. Ordered in 1981, they originally bore the RBDe 4/4 designation and road numbers 2100-2103. All four trainsets (RBDe 560 + Bt) were delivered in different color schemes, one of which was the livery used for the main series (blue over white sides, yellow doors, and red faces). The striking contrast to the green color scheme of previous SBB passenger stock led to the name Kolibri (Hummingbird), which is, however, rarely used. Nearly all the RBDe 560 sets have been named after smaller municipalities along the lines served by these trainset received the appropriate coat of arms.

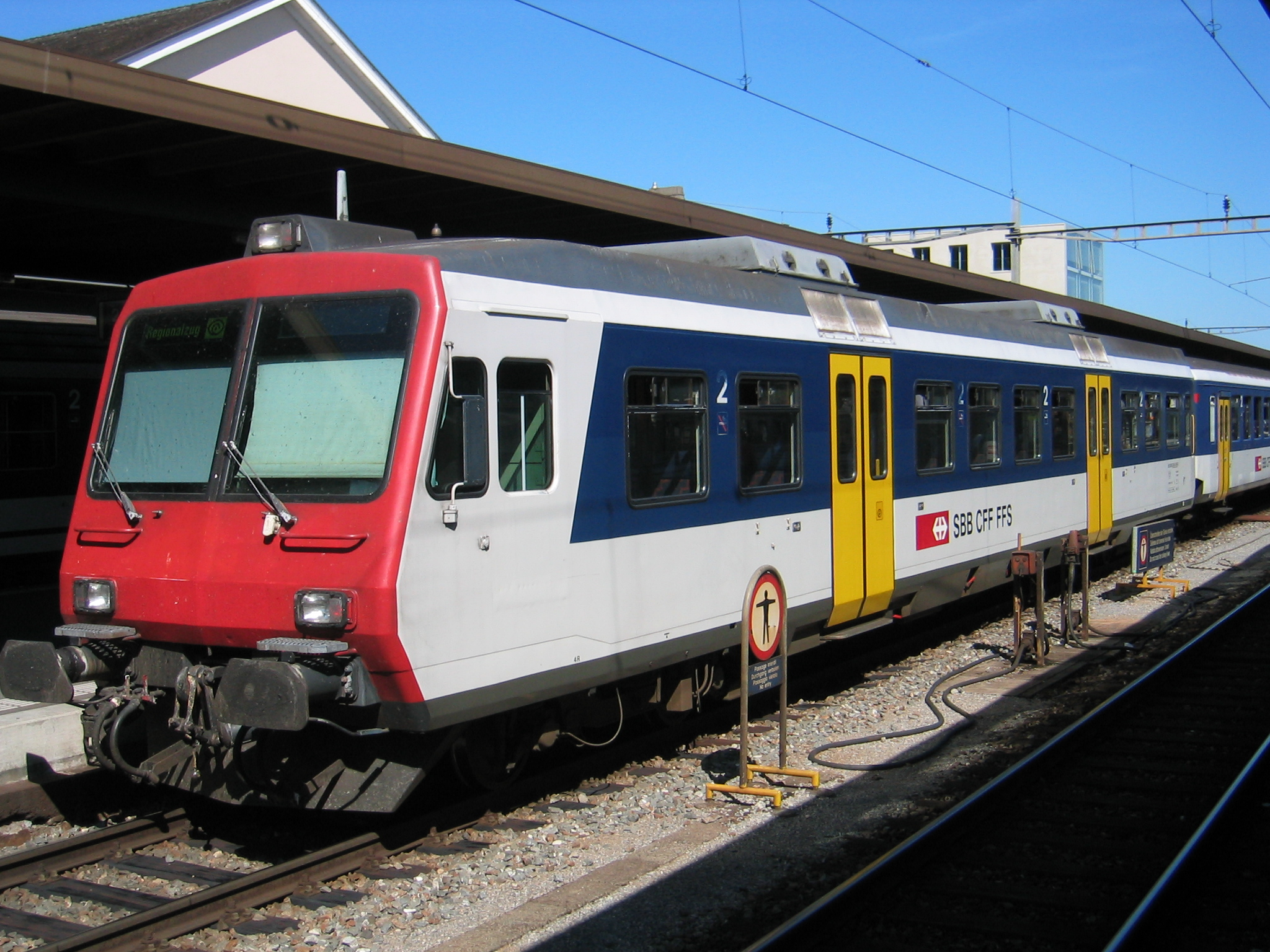
The matching NPZ driving trailer (Bt) in Biel

A full order for 80 trainsets followed. A few years later an additional order for a further 42 trainsets was placed. 6 trainsets were ordered by private railroads (Südostbahn (SOB), PBr, MThB, Montafonerbahn, etc.), resulting in a total production of 134 series trainsets. The last were put in service in 1996.

For cost reasons, up to the procurement of new low floor intermediate cars Domino starting in 2006, modernized Einheitswagen (EW) I and II coaches are used to achieve the desired passenger capacity. A standard set has a second class and a combined first/second class car, but sets with zero or up to three intermediate cars are being operated.

The motor cars have a power output of 1650 kW, a maximum speed of 140 km/h, a weight of 70 tons, and are 25 meters long. The series (560 000-083 through 560 100-141) forms the largest group of regional/suburban traffic motor cars of SBB, with 126 vehicles.

In May 2006 a modernization program by the SBB began for 120 of its trainsets. The motor cars and driving trailers are being refurbished and then matched with new air-conditioned low floor intermediate coaches to form Domino trains. The existing EW I and II coaches, after well over 40 years of service, were scrapped. Further use of the trucks on these coaches is being considered. The 188 new intermediate cars were to be delivered coinciding with the modernization, which was completed in 2013.

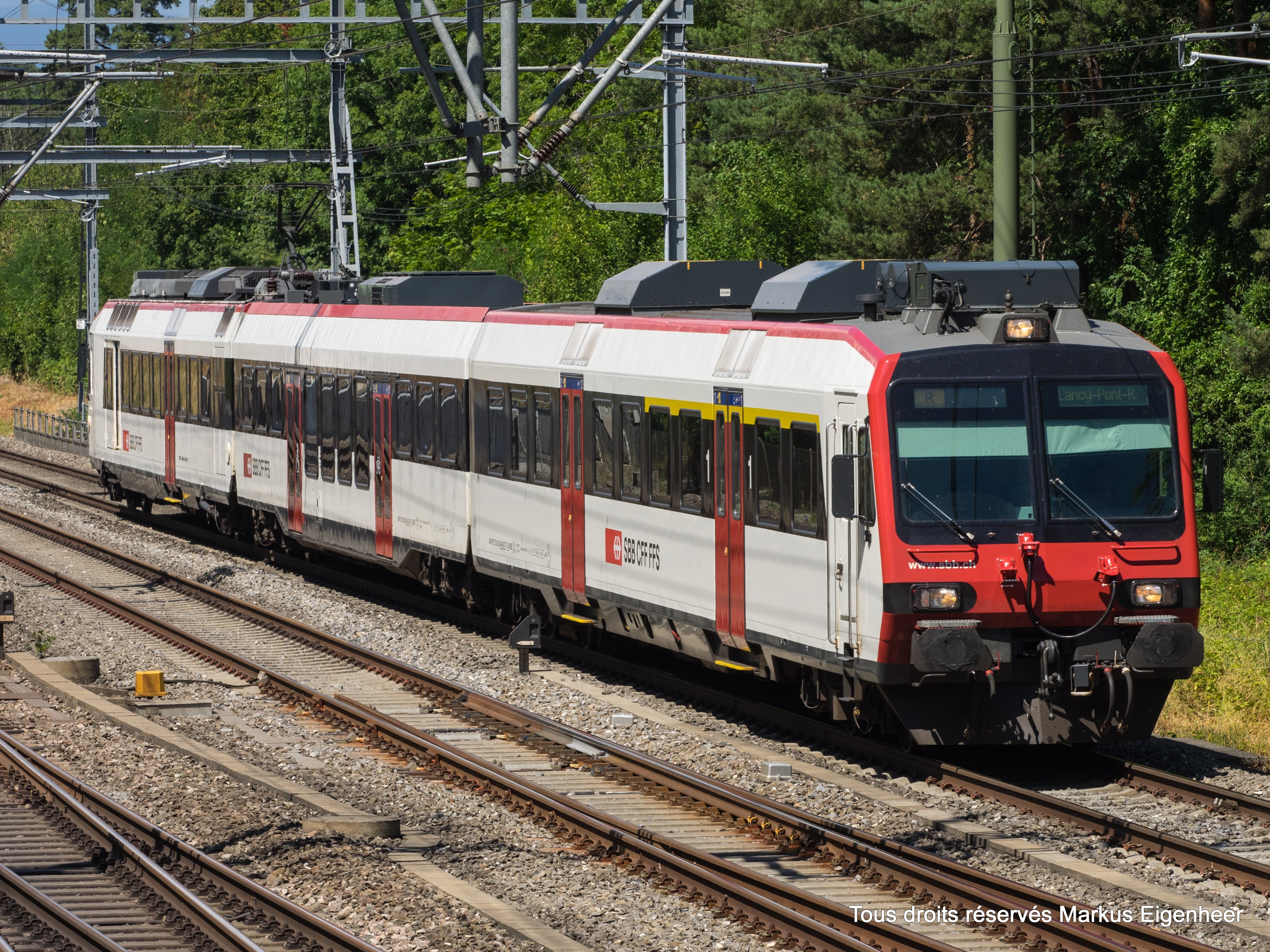
A modernized RBDe 560 set

The modernized RBDe 560 sets can be formed with up to four Domino intermediate carriages. The color scheme was also changed: the blue/white paintwork with yellow doors gave way to the SBB's usual ICN color scheme of white and black with red doors and front.

== Special liveries ==
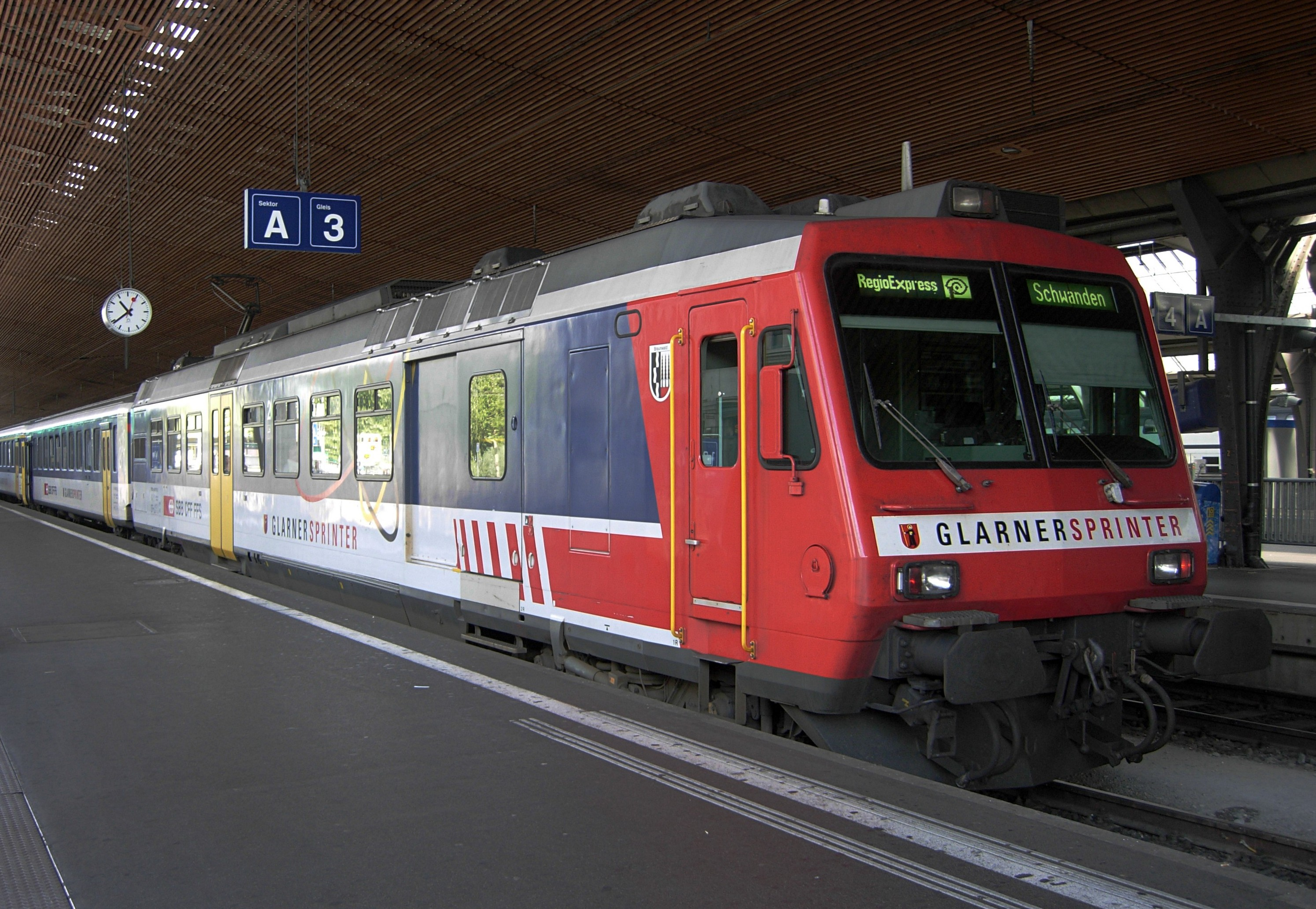
Glarner Sprinter color scheme in Zürich HB

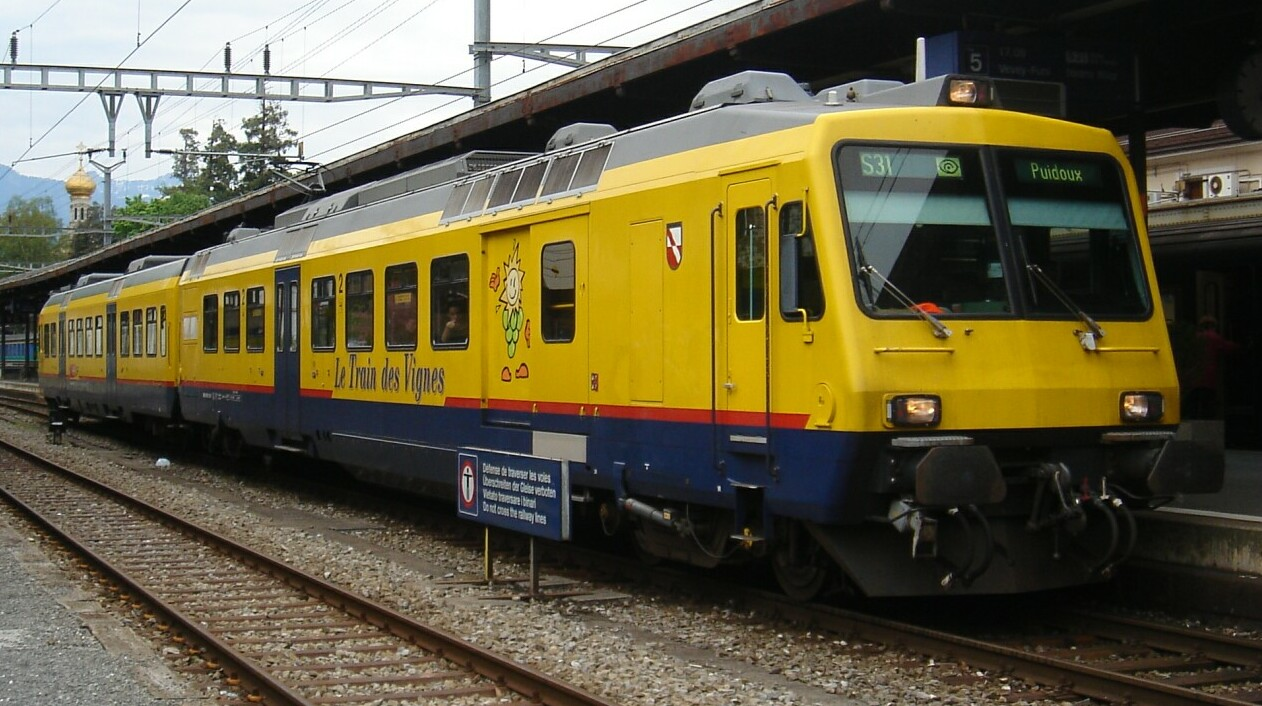
Train des Vignes at Vevey

The NPZ color scheme mentioned above is generally common today. The second production series (560 100 - 560 141) has the blue window strip extended all the way to the driver's compartment. In addition, numerous examples have logos of the various Swiss S-Bahn systems (Zürich, Basel, Bern, Ostwind, Réseau Express Vaudois, etc.) applied to the side of the locomotive near the driver's compartment.

Those units operating the Ticino-Lombardy Treni Regionali Ticino Lombardia (TILO) service have the full-size SBB logo removed, which is replaced by the TILO logo above the windows. The logos of SBB and Trenitalia (joint owners of TILO) are applied in a smaller format.

The two motor coaches assigned to the Glarner Sprinter service (560 120 and 560 123) have that logo applied alongside the SBB logo, as well as a special paint scheme consisting of various highlights to the base NPZ livery.

One set, RBDe 560 131 with Bt 29-35 931 got a special livery "train des vignes" for the Vevey–Puidoux-Chexbres line plus a stop on request system. RBDe 560 132/Bt 932 were fitted equally as replacement set but painted in the normal livery.

13 trainsets are assigned to the RegionAlps service.

== Variants ==
=== RBDe 561 ===
In 2003 six RBDe 560 (105, 127-128, 133-135) were converted to RBDe 561 (000-005) so that they could operate on the Wiesental section of the Basel S-Bahn (Basel - Zell im Wiesental, Germany). With the subsequent delivery of 10 RABe 521 (Stadler FLIRT) specifically for this network, these six RBDe 561 were returned in May 2006 to the Swiss side of the Basel S-Bahn and now operate again as RBDe 560. However, these trainsets remain recognizable because they still have certain German radio equipment installed.

=== RBDe 562 ===
At the beginning of 1997, only one year after delivery, six more RBDe 560 (136-141) were converted to operate on the French section of the Basel S-Bahn (between Basel and Mulhouse). These bi-current trainsets received the designation RBDe 562 (000-005), and are capable of operating on the 15 kV/16.7 Hz SBB standard as well as the 25 kV/50 Hz SNCF standard.

=== SOB RBDe 566 ===
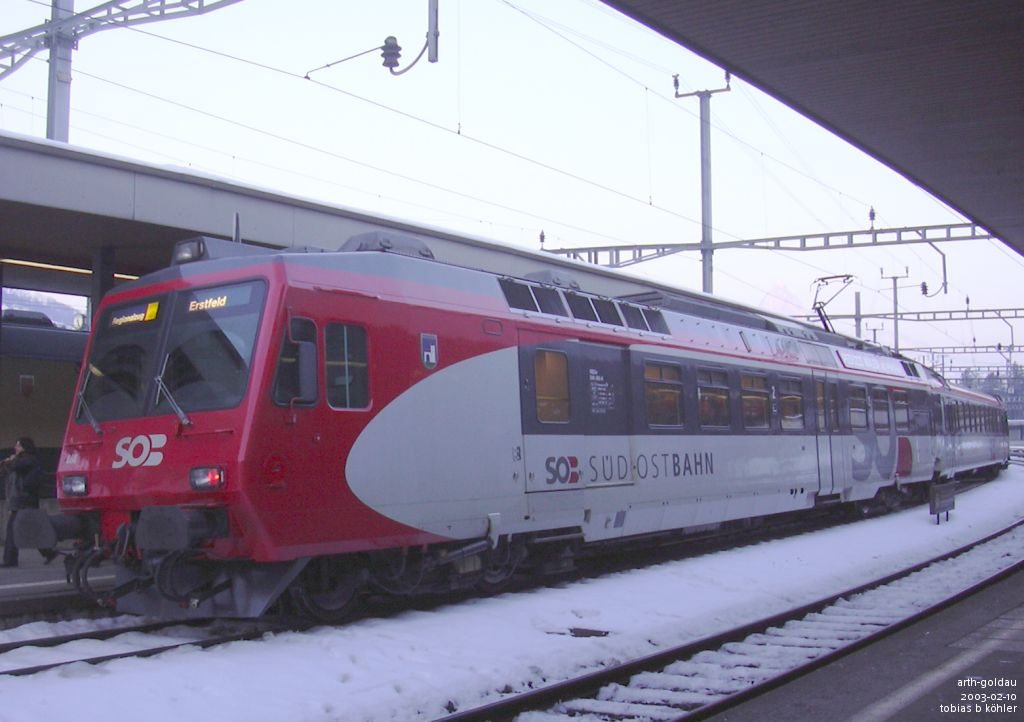
SOB variant in new livery

The Südostbahn (SOB) also ordered four two car NPZ sets (RBDe 566 + ABt), which were delivered out of the first production run in 1995 receiving fleet numbers RBDe 566 400-403. The SOB opted not to convert any intermediate cars for use with these trainsets. To provide first class accommodation the SOB control trailers have a first class compartment, thus the designation ABt, as opposed to SBB's second class only Bt. The motor cars are, except for the livery, identical to those of the SBB. The SOB has since converted several intermediate cars and operates the trainsets with them.

After the merger of the original SOB with the Bodensee-Toggenburg-Bahn (BT) to the new SOB, these four trainsets were repainted in the new livery of the SOB in 2003. They now operate throughout the SOB network as RBDe 566 077-080.

=== MThB RBDe 566 ===
For services on the Seehas line (the area near Konstanz, Germany), the Mittelthurgaubahn (MThB) in 1993 took four NPZ trainsets off the SBB's production line. These 4 trainsets came from the first production series, and were delivered to the MThB in 1994 numbered as RBDe 566 631-634. These 4 trainsets would have been the ninth to twelfth for the SBB, which subsequently increased its total order by four.

These four MThB trainsets were also delivered with one new intermediate car each. Two additional driving trailers were used with older ABDe 536. Because they operate into Germany as well as within Switzerland, the vehicles were equipped with the Indusi train safety system and a wider pantograph shoe.

Upon the dissolution of the MThB, the trainsets went to the successor company Thurbo and were operated on the Seehas German section by Thurbo's German subsidiary EuroTHURBO and later SBB GmbH. In 2006, nine Stadler FLIRT (RABe 526 651-659) took over the Seehas service. Thurbo subsequently sold the four trainsets plus the two extra driving trailers to SBB. They worked as RBDe 561 171-174/AB 30-35 671–674/Bt 29-35 971–976 in the S-Bahn Luzern system, partly over BLS tracks, for some time and have now been withdrawn. One motor car and two driving trailers were sold, the rest was scrapped.

=== Montafonerbahn ===
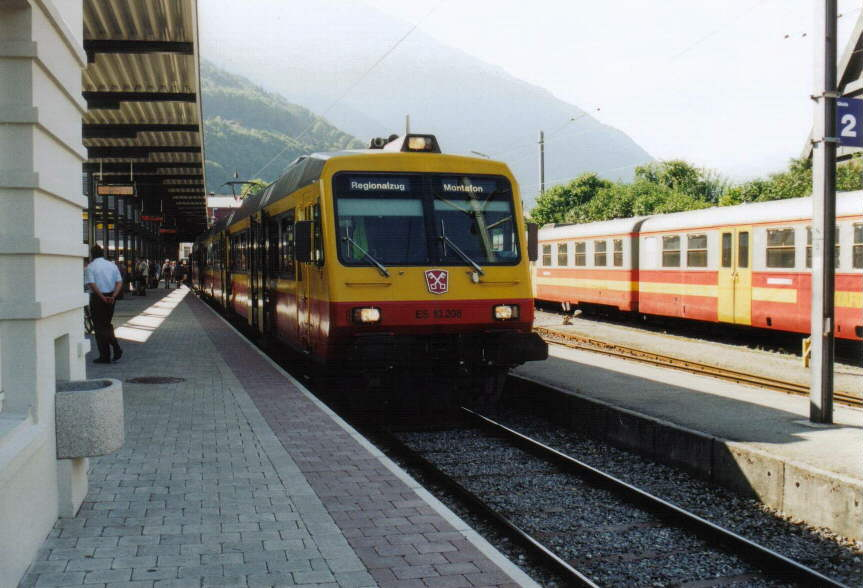
NPZ of the Montafonerbahn in Schruns

The Montafonerbahn, which is headquartered in Schruns, Austria, operates two two-piece NPZ sets. The first was built in 1990, following the SBB series 2100-2183, and the second in 1993, before the SBB second series.

=== PBr RBDe 568 ===
The Chemin de fer Pont Brassus (PBr) has never possessed its own locomotives, but has always subcontracted operation to the SBB, which guarantees through service between Vallorbe–Le Pont (SBB) and the PBr route Le Pont-Le Brassus in the Vallée de Joux.

The "+2" in the first series production count are the two trainsets which were sourced in 1989 the line and went to the PBr. The locomotives originally received the designation RBDe 4/4 2184-2185. Only small labels referring to the PBr as the owner of these vehicles distinguished them, while the SBB remains responsible for their maintenance and operation. After the January 2001 merger of the PBr with the Chemin de fer Yverdon - Ste Croix (YSteC), which formed TRAVYS, the trainsets were repainted into that company's new livery and the motor coaches renumbered RBDe 568 384-385.

== Closely related trainsets ==
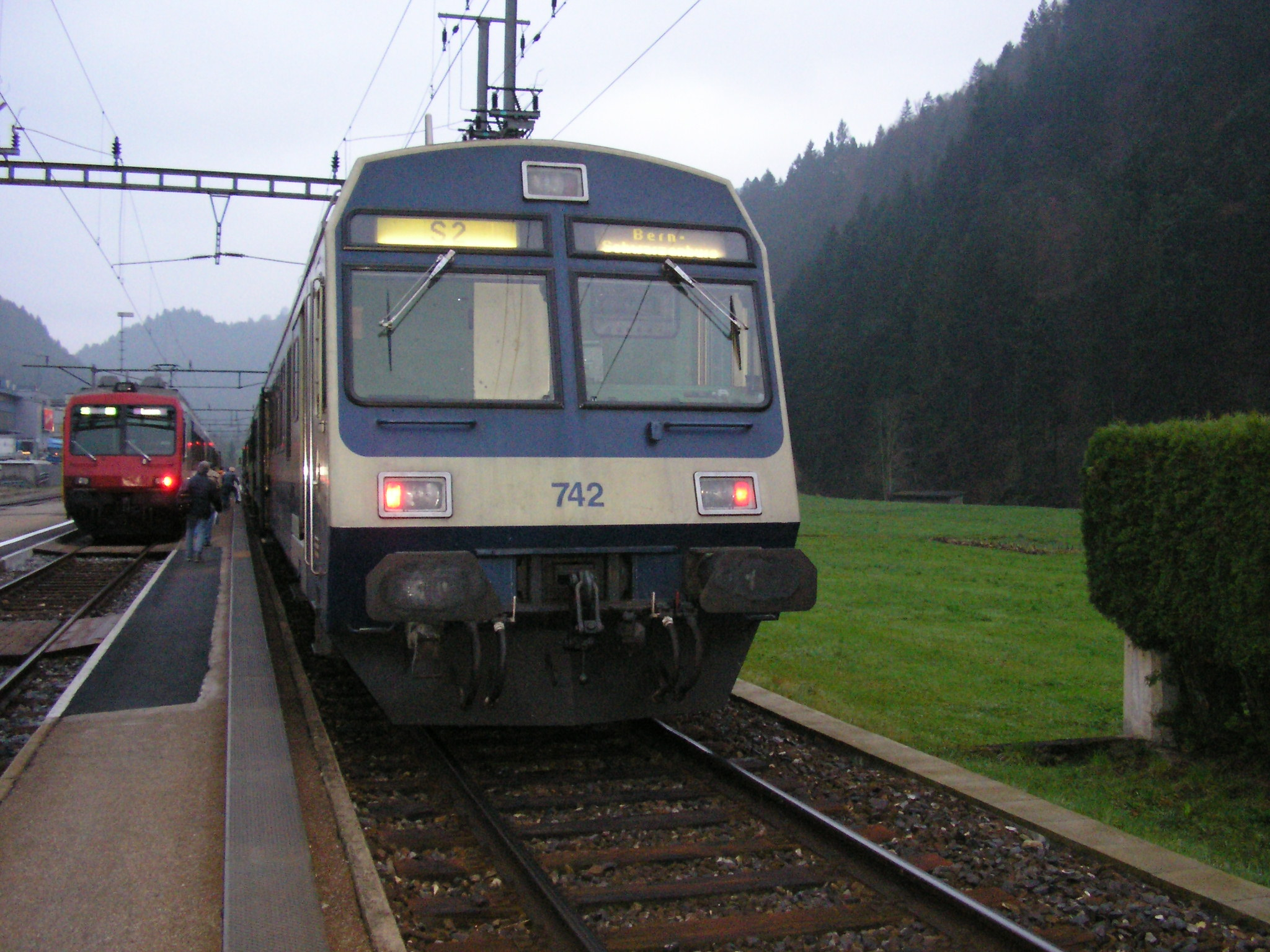
NPZ (left) and related BLS trainset (right)

There are several Swiss trainsets which are very similar to the RBDe 560 series, but are not identical. These were jointly developed by BLS and Bodensee-Toggenburg-Bahn (now Südostbahn) and first delivered in 1982. The SBB design was derived from these trains. They operate on various private railways as BLS RBDe 565, RBDe 566 II, Südostbahn RBDe 566 and TRN/tpf RBDe 567.

== See also ==
- List of stock used by Swiss Federal Railways

== Sources ==
This article was partially translated from the German language version of July 2006. It has been amended by the authors of the German article.
