= SBB Re 4/4 I =

Swiss express locomotive

SBB Re 4/4^{I}
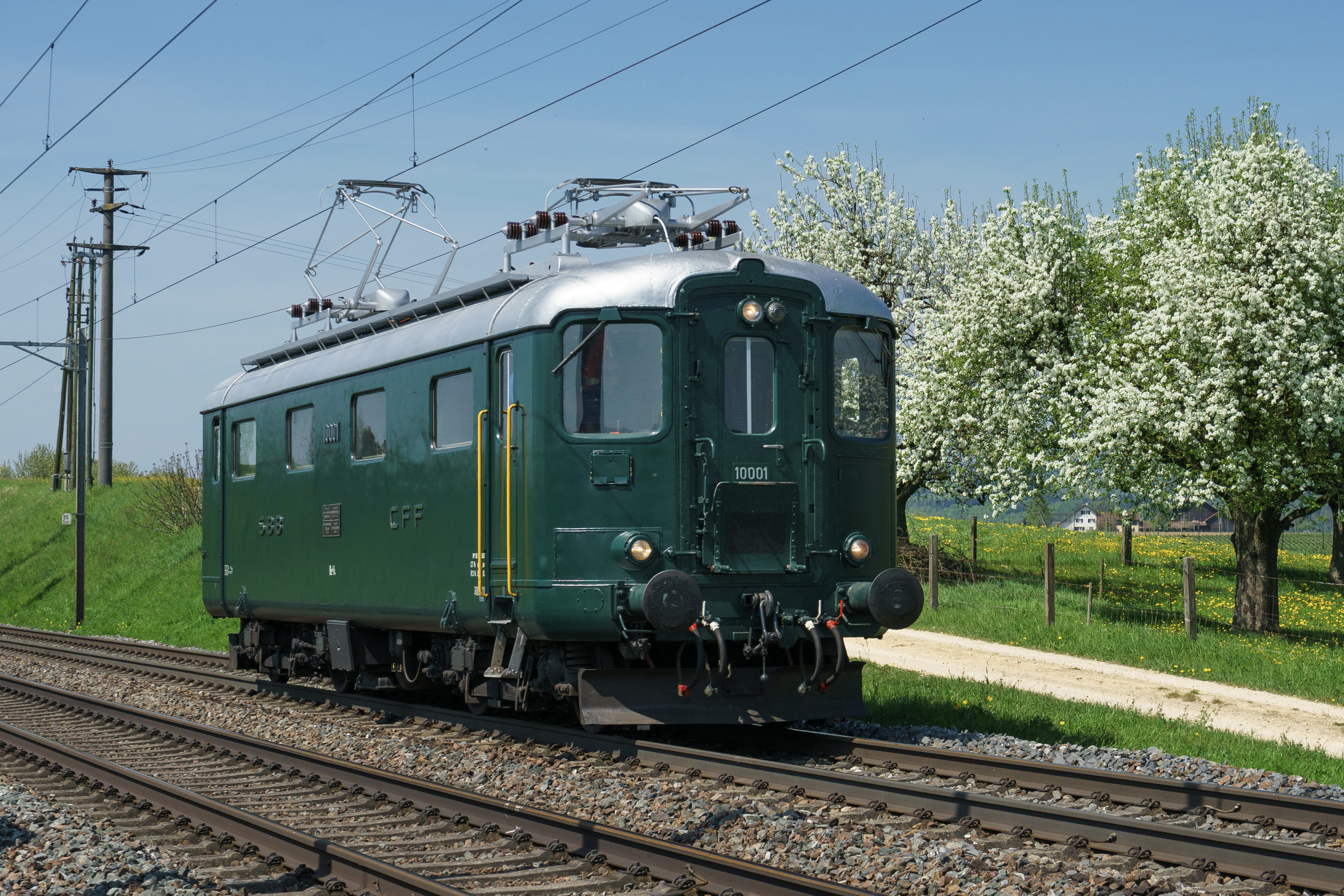
- Re 4/4^{I} 10001 of the 1st series (SBB Historic, 2018).
Type and origin
- Builder: SLM, BBC, MFO, SAAS
- Build date: 1946–1948 (1st series); 1949–1951 (2nd Series)
- Total produced: 50
Specifications
- Configuration
  - UIC: Bo’Bo’
- Gauge: 1,435 mm
- Driver dia.: 1,040 mm
- Length
  - Over beams: 14,700 mm (1st series); 14,900 mm (2nd Series)
- Width: 2,950 mm
- Height: 3,700 mm
- Service weight: 57 t 1st series originally 56 t
- Electric system/s: 15 kV, 16⅔ Hz
- Traction motors: 4
Performance figures
- Maximum speed: 125 km/h
- Power output
  - 1 hour: 1,850 kW (2,480 PS) (1st series); 1,900 kW (2'520 PS) (2nd Series)
- Tractive effort
  - Starting: 135 kN
Career
- Numbers: 401–426 (original, 1st Series); 427–450 (original, 2nd Series); 10001–10026 (new, 1st series); 10027–10050 (new, 2nd Series)
- Retired: 1996–1998

The Re 4/4^{I} is a light electric express train locomotive of the Swiss Federal Railways (SBB for short) introduced 1946, which was built in two different series. These locomotives are the first bogie locomotives of the SBB. The SBB deliberately opted for a light fast train locomotive with only about 14 tons of axle load in order to be able to operate at even higher cornering speeds.

Their main remit was to run express trains on the east–west rail axis of Switzerland. The locomotives originally designated as Re 4/4 were displaced in the 1960s by the RBe 4/4 engines with a high performance and a little later the much more powerful Re 4/4^{II} in other services. Due to the Re 4/4^{II}'s introduction, the Re 4/4 was renamed to Re 4/4^{I}.

== Background ==
From 1935, the SBB used the light railcars of the type SBB CLe 2/4, the so-called Red Arrows. These could run at a top speed of 125 km/h. The vehicles were very popular from the beginning. For these short trainsets, however, their use was constrained. In particular, the limited seating in a fixed trainset was problematic.

For urban traffic between Zurich and Geneva, so-called light express trains with Ae 3/6^{I}s were therefore operated from spring 1936, whose maximum speed was increased to 110 km/h (numbers 10637–10714). The trailer load was limited to 150 t, which resulted in a three wagon limit for the existing rolling stock. With the introduction of light steel wagons from 1937, more passenger train cars could be attached, but the maximum speed remained 110 km/h. In 1937, the SBB procured two three-part railcar trains BCLe 8/12 501 and 502 that were able to reach 125 km/h -- even having reserve power for a maximum speed of 150 km/h. But they were also trainsets with the corresponding seating capacity problems, and, due to prewar fuel shortages affecting road use, passenger traffic demands on the SBB increased.

In 1940, the three baggage-compartment railcars RFe 4/4 601-603 were put into service. These met the requirement of maximum speed of 125 km/h. In terms of performance, however, these locomotives were too weak with only 1,340 horsepower (1,000 kW). The express trains would have needed to be run with uneconomic double or triple engines. In addition, one to two unused baggage compartments would also have been carried per train.

At the same time, the Berner Alpenbahn-Gesellschaft Bern-Lötschberg-Simplon (BLS for short) railway was looking for a replacement for its old Be 5/7 locomotives. A speedy bogie locomotive with an output of 4000 hp was required. The industry met these requirements in 1944 impressively with the Ae 4/4 weighing 80 t and that ran at 125 km/h. However, it had a 20 t axle load, too heavy for the 14 t the SBB needed.

== Specification ==
The SBB needed a light, high-speed locomotive that had to meet the following criteria:

- The locomotive should be able to drive at the same cornering speed as a light railcar, which meant 10 km/h faster than other locomotives. The static axle load could therefore not exceed 14 t.
- The locomotive had to carry trains up to 300 t on inclines of up to 12 ‰ with the same speeds and running times as the light railcars.
- On inclines up to 10 ‰, a train with 480 t, corresponding to 15 light steel wagons, should be able to run at 75 km/h and on a flat track at 125 km/h.
- A regenerative brake had to be available, with which the locomotive weight could be braked at 38 ‰ slopes and part of the trailer load at smaller slopes.
- An electropneumatic hopper control with 24 driving and at least 8 braking levels should be installed.
- The locomotive had to be able to be controlled remotely by a control car or a second locomotive.
- The appearance of the locomotive should match the light steel cars.

In fact, only the Re 4/4 of the first series met these criteria. The second series had no electric brake and therefore no regenerative brake and brake levels. The second series could not be controlled remotely from a control car or a second locomotive.

== Contract award ==
Project planning started in May 1943. In January 1944, the Board of Directors granted SBB a loan of CHF 4,200,200 for the procurement of six electric locomotives of the type Re 4/4.

The order to the Swiss locomotive industry was divided as follows:

- Swiss locomotive and machinery factory (SLM): Mechanical part and assembly of the BBC spring drive.
- Maschinenfabrik Oerlikon (MFO): assembly drawings and circuit diagrams for the electrical equipment, one third of the traction motors, all equipment of the utility power brake, auxiliary machines and instruments for engine, train heating, auxiliary power and lighting circuits.
- Brown, Boveri & Cie. (BBC): two thirds of traction motors, transformers, air main switches, pantographs and other high-voltage apparatus.
- Société Anonyme des Ateliers de Sécheron (SAAS): electro-pneumatic jumper control.

The contractors provided a significant advance in the locomotive power-to-weight ratio. For the Re 4/4 it was 44 hp/t, whereas for the earlier SBB Ae 3/6 locomotive it was 22 hp/t.

== Commissioning ==
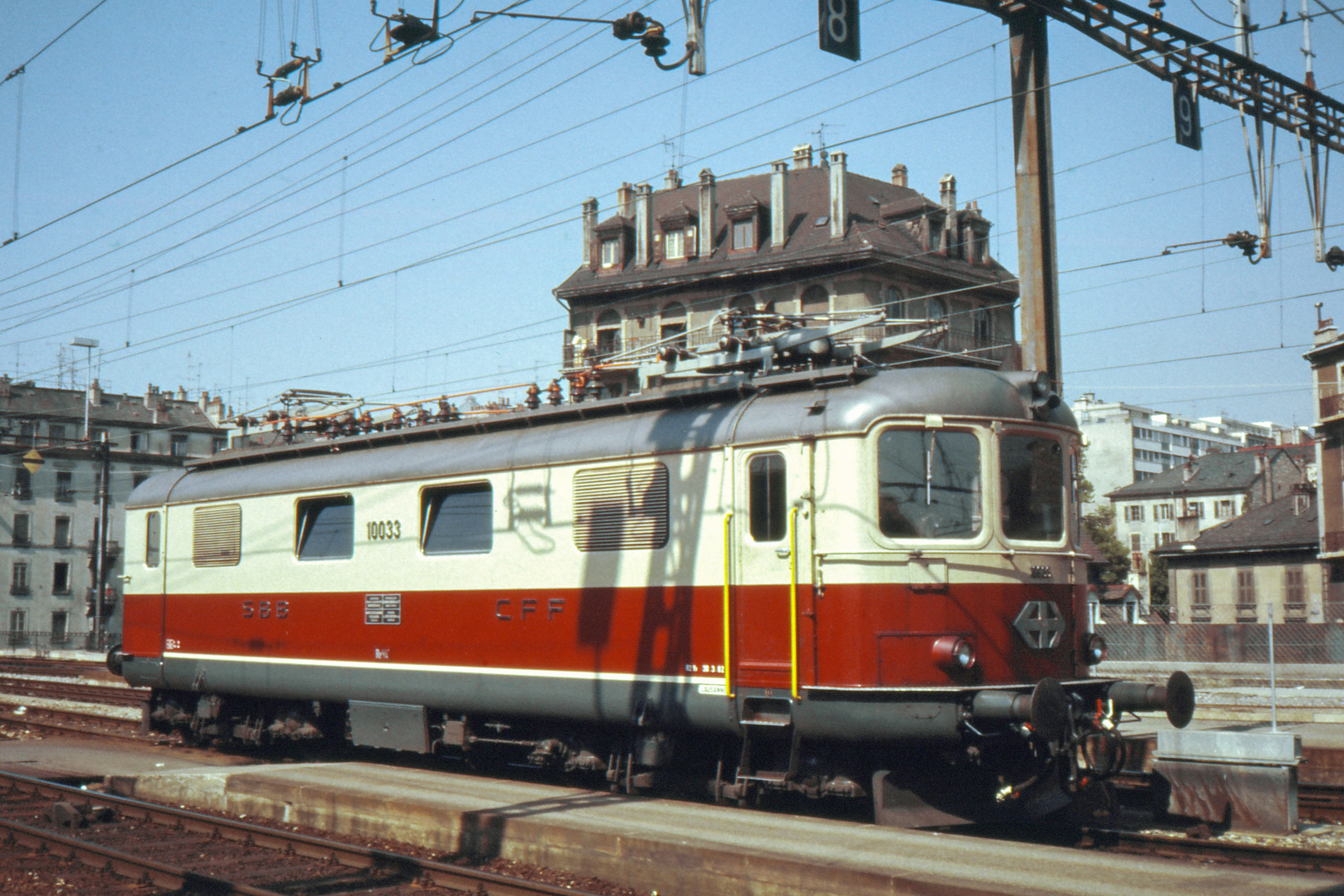
SBB Re 4/4^{I} 10033 TEE 2nd series in Geneva, 1982

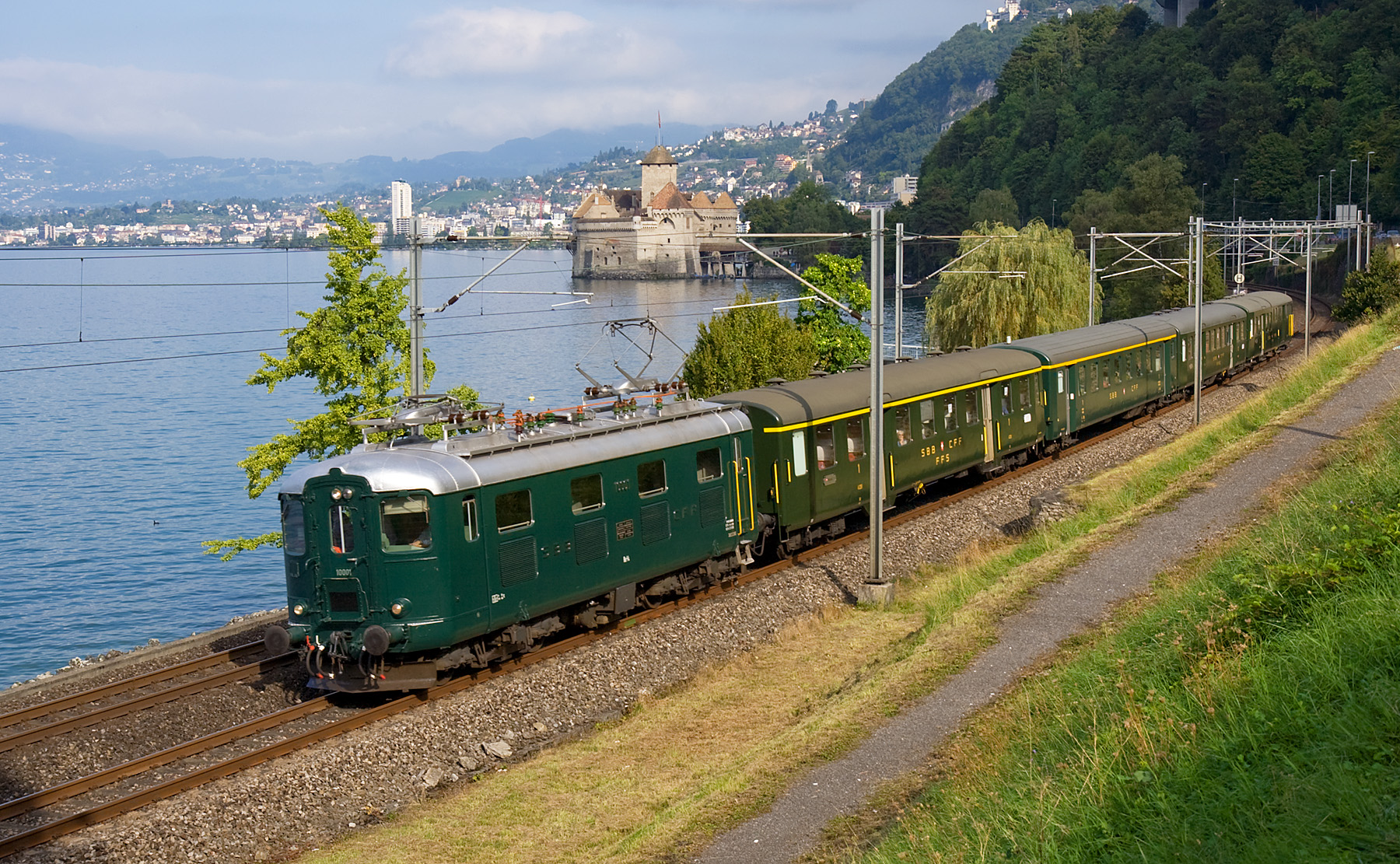
SBB Historic Re 4/4^{I} 10001, 1st series with front doors near Chateau Chillon, 2008

Series	Road number^{*}		Trial dates		Remarks
Series	before 1965	after 1965	from	until	Remarks
1st	401–406	10001–10006	22 Jan 1946	26 June 1946	with multiple-unit controls
1st	407–416	10007–10016	17 Sep 1946	17 Apr 1947	without multiple-unit controls
1st	417–426	10017–10026	31 May 1948	18 Nov 1948	driver's desk for standing and seated operation
2nd	427–450	10027–10050	25 Apr 1950	2 Nov 1951	without electric brakes and front doors
^{*}The pre-1965 numbers were anomalous. At this time it was customary to use three-digit numbers for railcars and express train steam locomotives. Four-digit numbers were provided for steam locomotives and diesel locomotives, and five-digit numbers for electric locomotives. Nevertheless, the locomotives received three-digit numbers.

On delivery, the SBB was not happy that the locomotive was 1 ton heavier than the contract specified. The excess weight did not impair its performance, however, and the unit was immediately drafted into scheduled service. The multiple-control features were tested and proved to be reliable after delivery of the remaining prototype units. Weight reduction was probably among the reasons for the lack of multiple-control on further units in the 1st series, as well as being expensive by the SBB's reckoning.

== Technology ==
=== Chassis, motors, equipment ===
The arrangement of the machinery and electrical equipment is almost the same for both series. However, there were differences in body layout. A high-gloss forest green body color matched the color of the light steel passenger wagons the locomotive was built to carry.

==== 1st series (401–426) ====
The right side corridor served for direct access to the machinery and equipment. The left side aisle was completely separated from the installations with a partition wall to allow passage for train personnel and passengers, for example, if the locomotive was remotely controlled by a control car and additional passenger cars were attached behind an intermediate locomotive. For the same reason, the 1st series had front doors, junction plates and bellows. The cooling air was sucked in on one side by low-lying blinds, which were on the side facing away from the passageway. This feature later caused considerable problems. Above it, as on the other side, were four windows.

==== 2nd series (427–450) ====
Due to the lack of the remote control, the second series was not able to run as a pusher/intermediate engine. Therefore, both side corridors were open for access to the machinery and equipment. The locomotives also did not have front doors. The machinery was ventilated by two high blinds on each side. In between were two windows, also on each side.

=== The mechanical part ===
==== Bogies ====
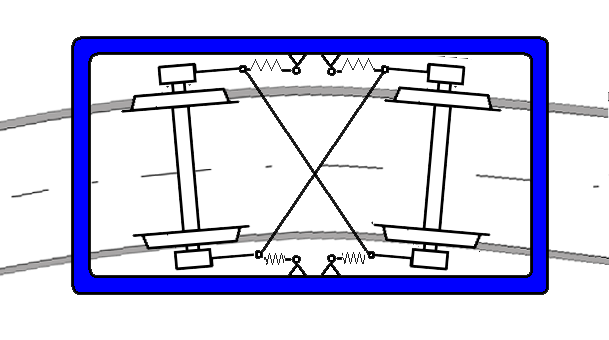
Bogie cross coupling scheme

The bogie frames consist of welded hollow beams. The solid track sweepers are attached to the outer crossbeam. The support for the train signal sensing magnets is located on the inner crossbeam of bogie I. The bogies are also connected to the inner crossbeams with an elastic cross coupling, which facilitates curve entry, smooth running and low track wear. The wheelsets are supported on the bogie by springs with internal silent blocks that dampen horizontal shocks. The wheels are spoked and small diameter to reduce weight.

==== Propulsion ====
The torque is transmitted to the drive axles by the motors fixed in the bogie via BBC spring drives, proven on the 1939 built Am 4/4 (later renamed Bm 4/4^{II}) diesel locomotive.

==== Tensile force transmission ====
The transmission of the traction and impact forces takes place via pivot pins and swivel sockets from the bogie to the locomotive body.

==== Locomotive box ====
The construction and design of the locomotive box were also derived from the Am 4/4. The box is tubular, more rigid and consists of the floor frame, the side walls and parts of the roof. These parts and those for the transmission of tensile and impact forces are made of steel. The rest of the roof and the end walls are made of light metal.

==== Compressed air system ====
A two-stage MFO piston compressor supplies the compressed air for the brakes and pneumatic apparatus via the main air tanks and an apparatus air tank. The pantographs are air-operated, along with the high-voltage main switch.

==== Brakes ====
The locomotives of the 1st series have an electric, referred to as a regenerative brake, service brake that also allowed the use, for example, on the Gotthard railway, plus an automatic Westinghouse type air brake with a wagon control valve.

The locomotives of the 2nd series do not have electric brakes, which restricted use on some lines. However, like the first series, they had a Westinghouse automatic brake with a car control valve.

The automatic brake is designed in both series as a two-stage, speed-dependent R-brake ("rapid brake"). In addition, the locomotives have a direct brake for braking the locomotive and a mechanical parking brake in both cabs. This acts in each case on the underlying bogie. The locomotives were the first to be equipped with Stopex brake rod adjusters. As a special feature, the brake linkage had to be mechanically "re-attached" when changing the brake blocks.

=== The electrical part ===
==== Main circuit ====
The lightweight pantographs of type "BBC 350/I", later "BBC 350/II" with spring-loaded rocker, the separator blades, the earthing switch and the high-voltage inlet are the same as in the Ae 4/6 locomotives. However, the transformer and control system were new. Therefore, a departure from the high-voltage control previously used for the Ae 8/14, Ae 4/6 and Ae 4/4 of the BLS was made.

The transformer converts the catenary voltage in separate windings to the traction motor, heating and auxiliary power voltage.

The SAAS jumper control had already proven itself with the Ae 3/5, Ae 3/6^{III} and the Be 4/7. It was now used again in the Re 4/4^{I} in a further improved form.

The two reversing switches establish the connections to the traction motors necessary for driving and braking. The first series locomotives had two positions for driving and braking, while the second series had only two driving positions.

The electric brake of the first series is designed as an excitation motor circuit. The traction motor 1 is fed by an exciter transformer and excites the motors 2–4, which operate as externally excited alternating current generators. These feed the current via the brake choke coil to the low-voltage side of the transformer. From the high-voltage side, the current flows back into the catenary. For the first time, this could be done by turning back the throttle handwheel without using any reversing switches.

The locomotives of the second series had no electric brake.

==== Motors ====
The traction motors of the first series are 8-pole and develop an hourly output of 471 kW at 456 V, 1150 A and 1240 revolutions per minute.

The engines of the second series are 10-pole and have an hourly output of 480 kW at 374 V, 1470 A and 1000 revolutions per minute.

==== Auxiliary power ====
The 220 V rated voltage for the auxiliary operations is taken at a special winding of the transformer. The auxiliary operations can also be energized without a catenary via a side-mounted socket to mains sources.

The auxiliary operations include:

- Compressor motor
- Two cooling fan motors
- Oil pump engine
- Motor for the converter group (36 V DC for control circuits)
- Zero voltage or minimum voltage relay
- Driver's cab heating
- Oil heating plate in the driver's cab (1st series)

== Operation ==
By the end of 1948, the 16 existing locomotives had covered 6.7 million kilometers. That was an annual average of 172,000 kilometers per machine. The record holder in 1948 was the number 410 with 255,218 km. The monthly services of the locomotives ranged from 25,000 km to 27,000 km. The largest daily rotation for the Re 4/4^{I} was 1050 km at that time.

In addition, the transported trailer loads resulted in a significant increase with a significant reduction in the power consumption compared to the Ae 3/6^{I}.

=== Weaknesses ===
In the mechanical part, these were above all the box suspension springs, which were narrowly dimensioned and of insufficient quality due to the war.

In the electrical part, among other problems, commutator wear on the eight-pole motors of the first series were of concern during the entire service life of the locomotives. Servicing was needed twice more often than the best older motors. Though light and fast, the locomotives were failure-prone until driven by the robust, but slightly slower motors of the 2nd series.

As with the other railway and tram vehicles built at that time and equipped with them in Switzerland, difficulties initially arose, especially in the area of hopper control, although this was already used in older railcars. The high currents drawn at low speed acceleration from standstill overwhelmed the circuitry and caused transformer explosions. The defect was circumvented by drivers limiting use of these throttle levels.

The relatively weak electric brake (only available in the first series), which was intended for use on the ramps of the Gotthard line, also created a lot of trouble. Due to the fact that it was often unused, the shuttle train locomotives originally looked like moving cast iron cleaning plants shortly after overhauls, as did all other locomotives that ran in shuttle train services: the Ae 3/5 locomotives, the De 4/4 passenger cars and the Be 4/6 passenger cars. It was originally almost impossible for the depots to keep them clean, which became particularly noticeable with the appearance of the first Re 4/4^{I} in red livery.

In the first series, especially in the harsh winter of 1962/63, major problems with electrical arcing occurred. After the delivery of suitable control cars (Dt, DZt, BDt, ABt), these locomotives ran remotely controlled in shuttle train operation for half of the journeys at the end of the train and sucked in a lot of snow and dirt through the low-lying, simple ventilation grids (louvers). As a result, the engines failed repeatedly, and arcing in the rest of the electrical part also occurred quite frequently. It was hoped that a remedy of this would be by a larger conversion of the entire first series according to experience with German railways. There, the same difficulties occurred with the electric pusher locomotives of the DB E 41. Installing filtered ventilation grilles in place of the previous ventilation slats was a resounding success. The SBB decided to rebuild all 26 locomotives of the first series accordingly. On the side without the internal corridor (which is not accessible to the public and train staff) filtered ventilation grilles were installed on all eight window and fan openings, while the ventilation openings on the other side of the locomotive were welded shut. This conversion improved the situation markedly, but gave the locomotive a rather beefy appearance on the windowless side. In addition, the main air tank shut-off valves, which had previously been mounted externally on the main air tanks (below the center of the locomotive, across the body), were relocated to the engine room.

== Modifications ==
The number of conversions and changes was varied. Reference should be made here to the specialist literature. The most important change was the installation of the multi-control in the locomotives 409–426 up to 1960 with simultaneous renumbering to 10009–10026, and the eventual conversion of all locomotives to multi-control capability.

== Use ==
The locomotives operated for a long time in the express train service, especially in the Swiss Plateau on the Zurich-Genève and Lucerne-Schaffhausen lines. Here, however, they were replaced in the early 1970s by shuttle trains with RBe 4/4 railcars. These had become free by the use of the Re 4/4^{II} in the Swiss Plateau. Thanks to their prodigious haul capability, the Re 4/4^{I}s then came into a long-lasting use in regional traffic. They were also able to demonstrate their impressive performance once again on mountain routes such as the Gotthard ramps.

The locomotives of the second series were used in the second phase of their operational period on the one hand for use in exclusive passenger train traffic (TEE Rheingold, TEE Bavaria) and on the other hand in regional train traffic. The locomotives 10033, 10034, 10046 and 10050 received the TEE livery in 1972 and the locomotives 10033 and 10034 a pantograph with a wide 1950 mm rocker according to DB/ÖBB standard for the TEE Bavaria to Lindau.

As early as 1960, the two locomotives 10036 and 10037 (together with the Ae 4/7 10948–10951) had been equipped with a wider pantographs to ensure through traffic from St. Margrethen via Bregenz to Lindau, where locomotives changed for trains bound to Munich. This run ended in 1967, when Re 4/4^{II} took over the leadership of the express trains. From 1969 the locomotive runs were resumed with the then freshly delivered Re 4/4^{II} 11196–11201.

Locomotives of both building lots were also always good for the management of replacement services for regular trains.

As the only locomotive with a top speed of 125 km/h at the time, the Re 4/4^{I} were also frequently on the road with test trains until they were replaced by the Re 4/4^{II}.

The Re 4/4^{I} also performed frequent operations as an extra, lead locomotive before any type of train, and at the beginning of their career, even in front of steam locomotives.

== Retirement ==
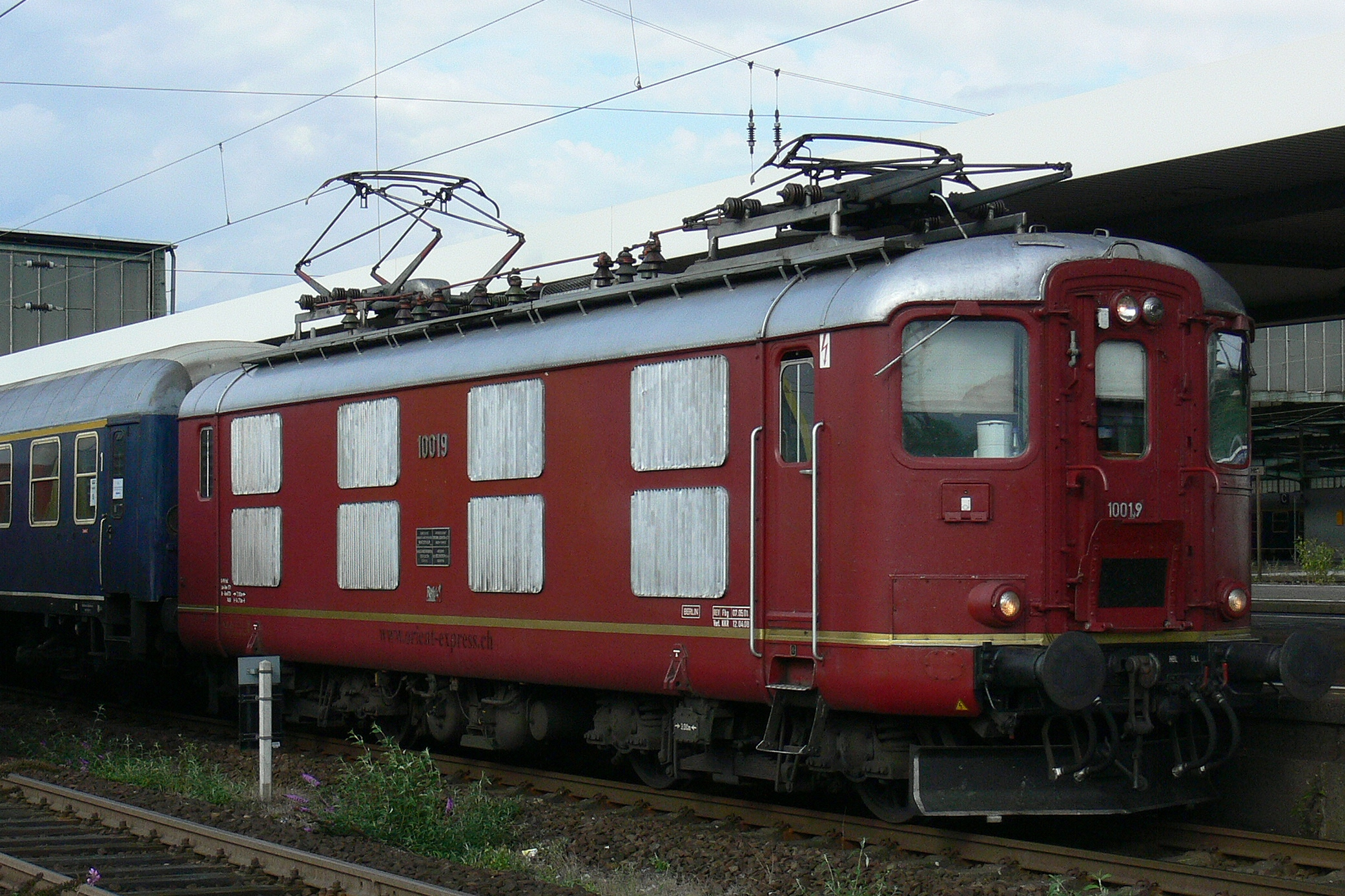
Centralbahn Re 4/4 I^{I} 10019 of the 1st series at Duisburg Hauptbahnhof, 2007

The last operations for the machines of the second series took place in Basel SBB, where, after withdrawing from track service, they carried out shunting and washing services equipped with rear-view mirrors and shunting radio, until they were displaced by the prototype railcars RBe 4/4 1401–1406.

There were serious efforts to obtain the locomotive 10050, which was used in the former TEE wine red/creme livery until the end of its operation. This was the last locomotive available in these colors by the SBB, and a covered parking space could have been found for them for better preservation - in contrast to the fast railcar RAe 4/8 1021 ("Churchill-Pfeil") and the RAe TEE II. Even submissions to Transport Minister Moritz Leuenberger to preserve the 10050 were unsuccessful. The responsible SBB main workshop Yverdon had the locomotive broken down without further ado by the scrap dealer Flückiger in Rothrist. Because of language difficulties, it was assumed at Flückiger (in German-speaking Switzerland) that the SBB would pay 3500 francs for scrapping the locomotive; but at the SBB (main workshop in the French-speaking Yverdon-les-Bains) they wanted this amount for the locomotive. Finally, after the SBB had lost in court, Flückiger had to be given a few freight cars to be scrapped as compensation.

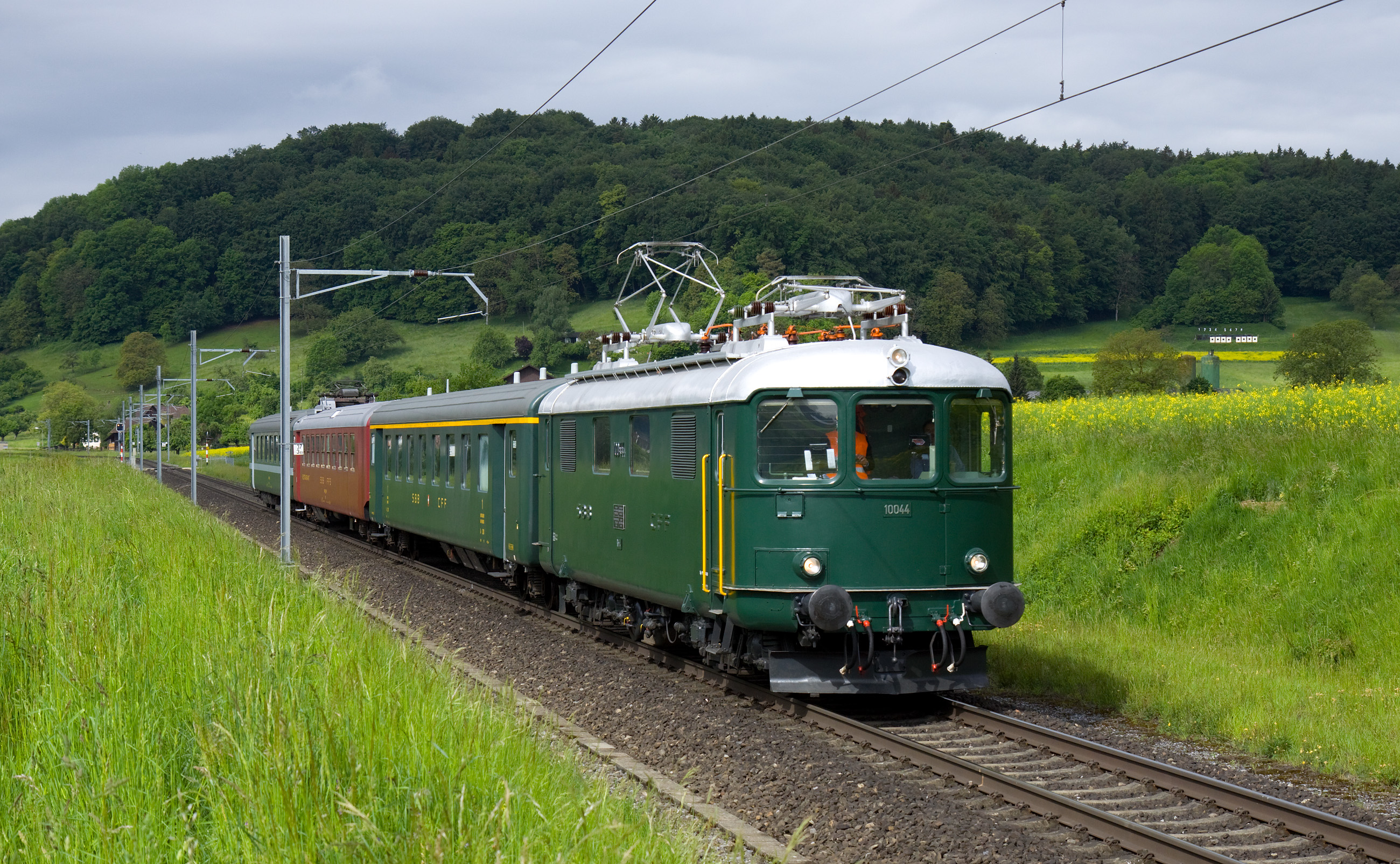
SBB Historic Re 4/4^{I} of the 2nd series with an extra train at Otelfingen, 2009

SBB took possession of two locomotives, 10001 (1st series, condition 1950s, location Olten) and 10044 (2nd series, location Rapperswil) into their inventory of the historic locomotives. Six locomotives were sold to the Classic Rail association. Three more were sold to German organizations. Two ended up in the Darmstadt Railway Museum and the third was acquired by a private individual. The remaining locomotives were demolished. Classic Rail Locomotives sold four of the locomotives to the now defunct Mittelthurgaubahn, MThB for short, which used them in free access in Switzerland for various transport tasks. This happened to the displeasure of SBB, as it had linked the sale to Classic Rail with the fact that the Re 4/4^{I} was no longer to be used on the SBB network. Two of these locomotives were subsequently owned by Rail4chem as Re 416 with the numbers 626 and 627.

The locomotive 10034 in TEE livery has been used by the railway club TEE CLASSICS in front of museum trains since 2009.

The extant locomotives are:

Owner	Road number	Status
SBB Historic	10001	operational
Classic Rail AG	10002	static display in Luino (I)
Centralbahn AG	10006	not operational (roster)
Centralbahn AG	10008	not operational (roster)
Classic Rail AG	10009	operational
Classic Rail AG	10016	operational
Centralbahn AG	10019	not operational (roster)
Swisstrain SA	10032	not operational
TEE Classics	10034	operational
Swiss Rail Traffic AG	10039	operational
Classic Rail AG	10042	not operational
SBB Historic	10044	mothballed
Classic Rail AG	10046	static display at Locorama Romanshorn

== See also ==
- Franz Eberhard: Leichtbaulok Re 4/4I. Geramond Verlag, Munich 1999, ISBN 3-932785-53-3
- Claude Jeanmaire: The electric and diesel-powered vehicles of Swiss railways. The locomotives of the Swiss Federal Railways (SBB).
- Karlheinz Hartung: Small type customer Swiss locomotives. Transpress Verlag, Stuttgart 1997, ISBN 3-613-71069-2.
- Franz Eberhard, Hansueli Gonzenbach: Faszination Re 4/4 I. The popular light fast train locomotive of the SBB: the original and its replicas. Fachpresse Zürich, Zürich 2007, ISBN 3-9522945-9-4.
- Swiss locomotive and railcar classification
