= SBB Ae 3/5 =

Swiss electric locomotive

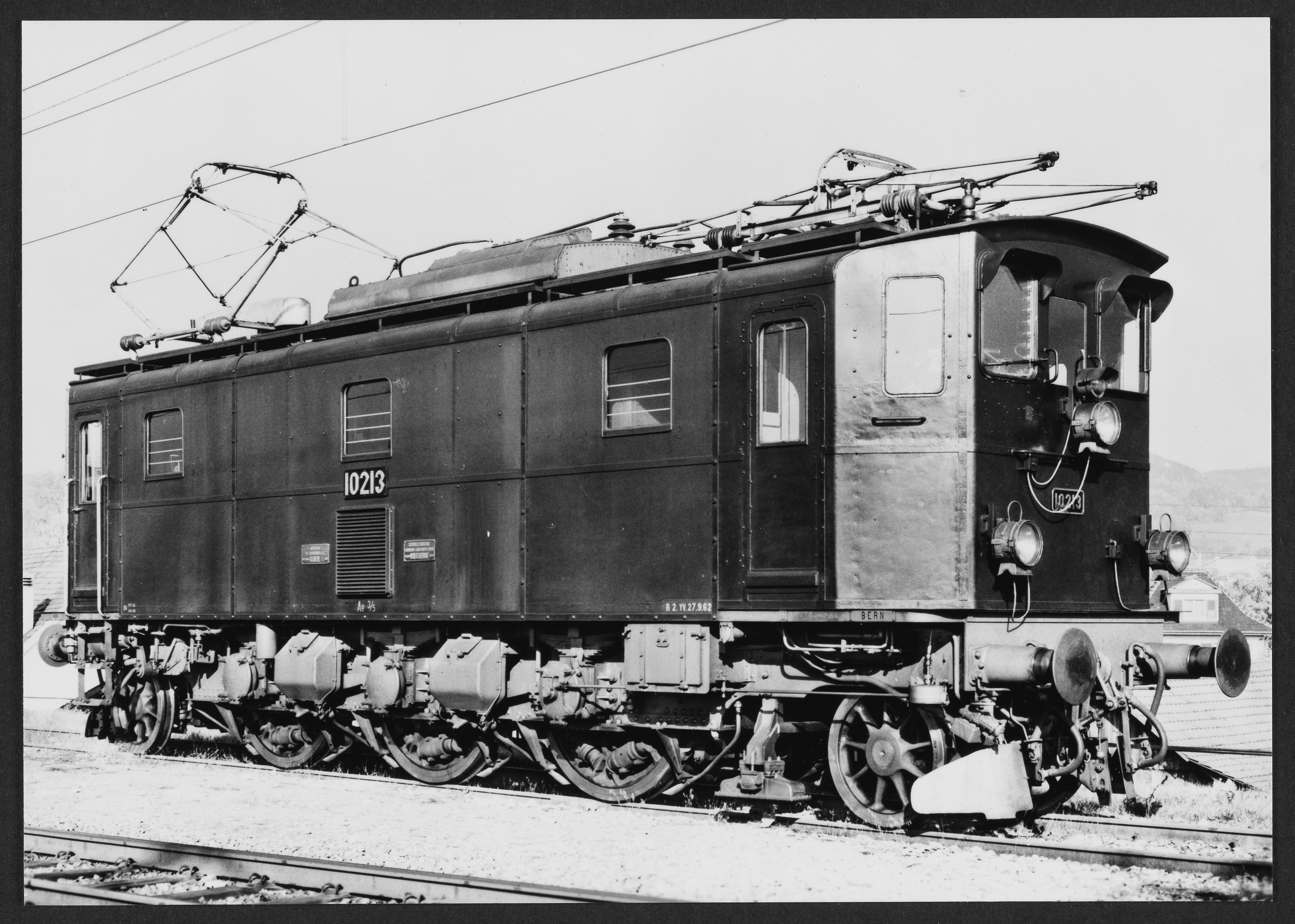
Type and origin
- Power type: Electric
- Builder: Swiss Locomotive and Machine Works and Société Anonyme des Ateliers de Sécheron
- Build date: 1923-1925
- Total produced: 26
Specifications
- Gauge: 1,435 mm (4 ft 8 1/2 in) standard gauge
- Length: 12,300 mm (40 ft 4 1/4 in)
- Adhesive weight: 56 long tons (57 t; 63 short tons)
- Loco weight: 81 long tons (82 t; 91 short tons)
- Electric system/s: Catenary
- Current pickup(s): Pantograph
- Traction motors: electrical 3x2
- Loco brake: Westinghouse, manual screw-type
- Train brakes: Westinghouse
Performance figures
- Maximum speed: 90 km/h (56 mph))
- Power output: (1 hour rating) 972 kW (1,303 hp)
Career
- Operators: Swiss Federal Railways
- Numbers: 10201-10226
- Official name: Ae 3/5
- Nicknames: Petite Sécheron (Little Secheron)
- Withdrawn: circa 1977

The Ae 3/5 was a Swiss electric locomotive, operating out of Lausanne from 1926 to 1957, then out of Berne from 1957 to 1982. The examples were withdrawn from service starting in 1977, with one since classified as an historic vehicle.

== History ==
The symmetrical drive system of the locomotives are roughly equal to that of the Be 4/7. Both operated with quill drive motors on each drive axle.

The first units were delivered without locomotive brake safety systems; these were added later. At the end of the Second World War, the maximum speed was reduced to 75 km/h. After repairs, they were again allowed proceed at speeds of 90 km/h. In 1957, the brake system was modified and traction brakes were installed.

The locomotives were equipped with remote control ability (from a control car) between 1963 and 1966; it was not possible to control the locomotives from the units themselves. Up to two units of this type could be controlled from a control car. Once upgraded to remote units, the locomotives hauled automobile trains along the Gotthard railway and the Simplon Railway.

The Ae 3/5 proved to be reliable locomotives in both freight and express passenger service. They were largely unchanged during their operating lifetime except for having welded front doors near the end of their service lives. Delivered in a brown paint scheme, they were later given a dark green paint job.

Notwithstanding their reliability, the Ae 3/5's short wheelbase and stiff drive train led to poor cornering characteristics, leading to track damage at high speeds, and to their redesign as the Ae 3/6^{III}.

== See also ==
- List of stock used by Swiss Federal Railways
