= SBB Ae 3/6 series =

Series of electrical locomotives

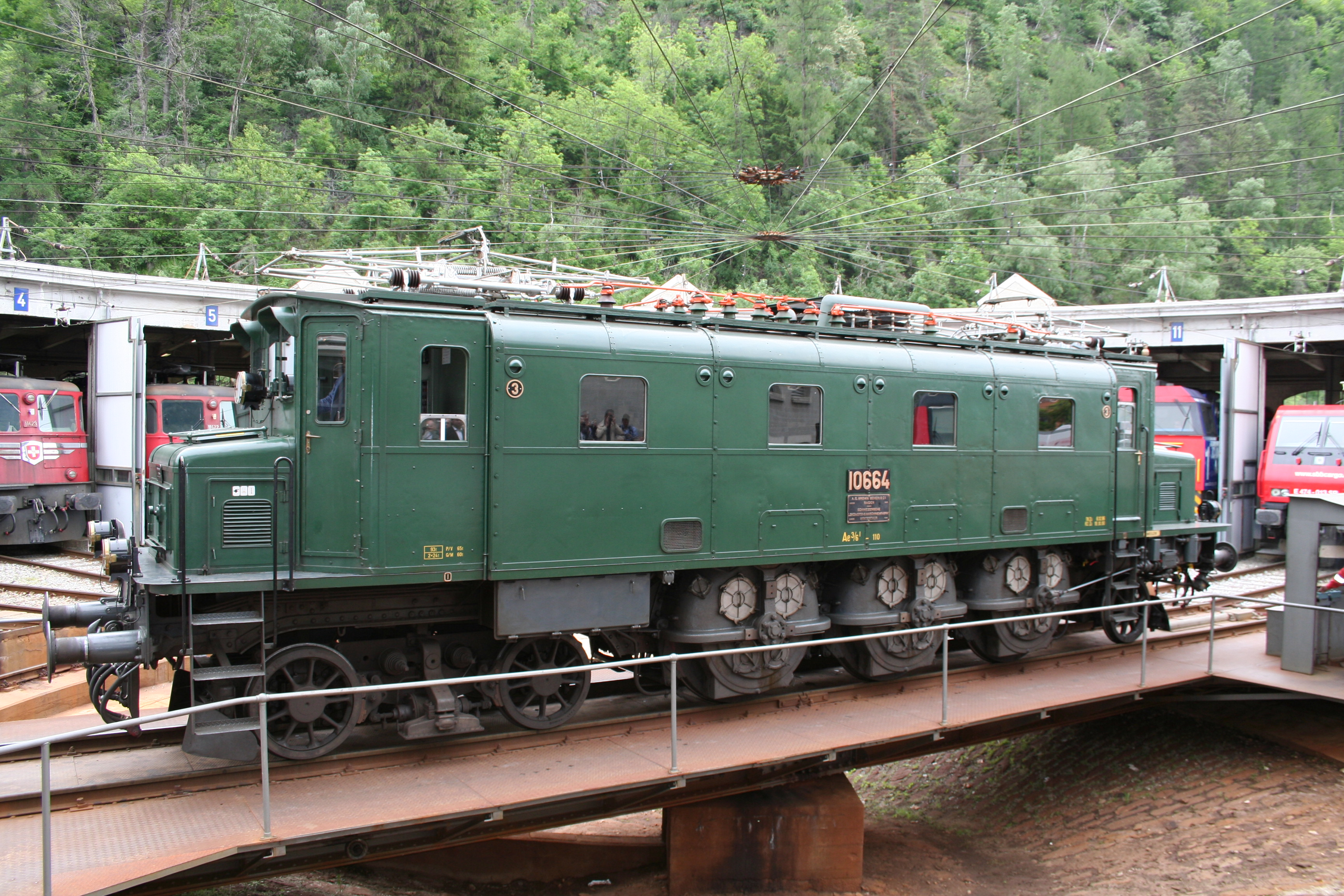
Ae 3/6^{I}

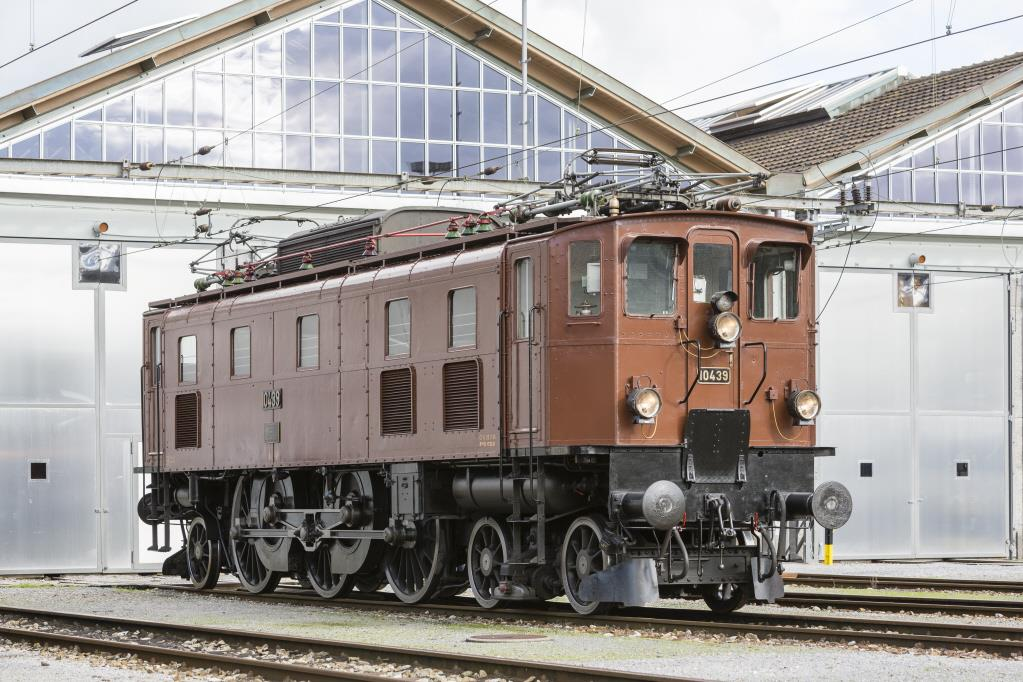
Ae 3/6^{II}

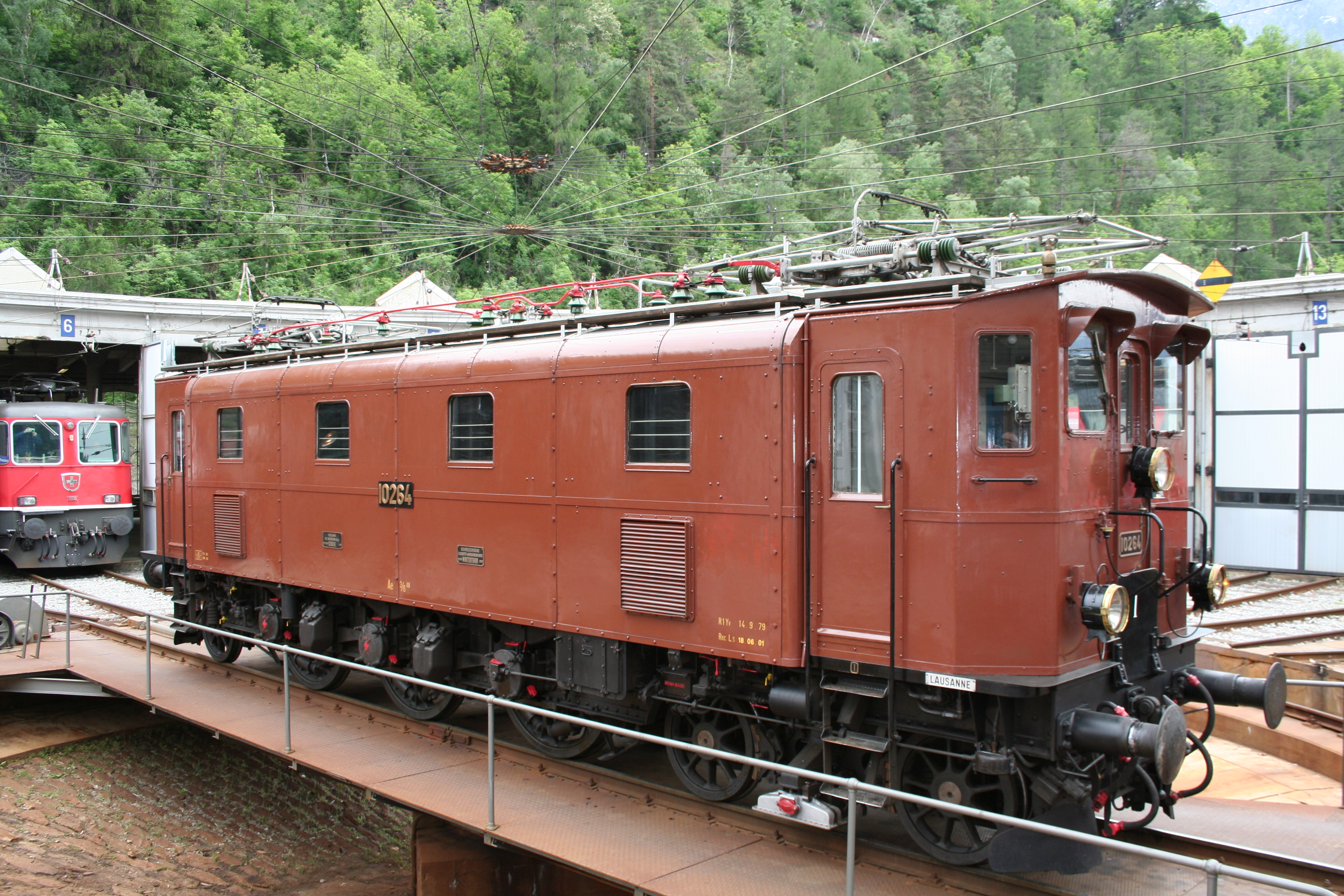
Ae 3/6^{III}

The SBB Ae 3/6 is a series of electrical locomotives designed for both freight and passenger service on Swiss lowland railways. The series comprises three separate models: the Ae 3/6^{I}, the Ae 3/6^{II}, and the Ae 3/6^{III}. They were constructed in lots between 1920 and 1929. They were the most numerous series of SBB locomotives constructed, and operated for around 70 years until the last units retired in 1994. The individual members of the series differ in how they are driven: the Ae 3/6^{I} and Ae 3/6^{III} by motors on each powered axle, and the Ae 3/6^{II} by two motors connected to the center drive axle with countershafts, and then with rods to the other two driven axles. The asymmetrical undriven axle arrangement is due to the main transformer needing to be displaced to the front of the locomotive from the center of the body by the large traction motors located there.

== Background ==
With the rapid electrification of the Swiss rail network in the early 20th century, the SBB urgently needed powerful electric locomotives for heavy train haulage, as well as locomotives for light express train service in the lowlands. The first electric locomotives for the SBB were delivered as early as 1906 for use on the Simplon line, albeit with three-phase drive technology, which was later discontinued. Starting in the 1920s with the electrification of the Gotthard line, the SBB's introduction of electric locomotives using the single-phase 15 kV 16⅔ Hz AC technology, still used today, gained momentum.

At the beginning of the first electrification phase in 1920, the SBB commissioned designs for a lowland universal locomotive. Only a few specifications were required, including: three driving axles, a power output of 2,000 hp, a top speed of 90 km/h, and a maximum axle load of 20 tons. The three Swiss electrical companies Brown, Boveri & Cie (BBC), Maschinenfabrik Oerlikon (MFO), and Société Anonyme des Ateliers de Sécheron (SAAS) were otherwise largely given free rein.

SBB required the manufacturers to comply with the following specifications:

- Maximum speed 90 km/h
- Carriage of a 480 t trailer load on a 2 ‰ gradient at 90 km/h
- Three round trips from Zurich to St. Gallen (85 km) with a 480 t trailer load in 10 hours
- Three round trips from Villeneuve to Brig (117 km) with a 480 t trailer load in 11.5 hours, each with a 15-minute stop at the terminal stations
- Starting with a 480 t trailer load on a 10 ‰ gradient and accelerating to 55 km/h in a maximum of four minutes.

The following designs were submitted and subsequently purchased: BBC: Ae 3/6^{I}, MFO: Ae 3/6^{II}, and SAAS: Ae 3/5 (which ultimately became the Ae 3/6^{III}). Swiss Locomotive and Machine Works provided the mechanical parts.

== Technology ==
=== Mechanical ===
The Ae 3/6^{I} had motors on the sprung frame connected via a Buchli drive to each driven axle. The Ae 3/6^{II} had two motors on the sprung frame each connected to a countershaft yoked to the center driving axle which was then linked with side rods to the other two driving axles. Ae 3/6^{III} had a Westinghouse quill drive with the motors on the sprung part of the frame.

The asymmetrical axle arrangement around the drive axles (bogie in front, Bissel axle at rear) was due to the main transformer placement. The large traction motors located in the center of the frame over the drive wheels left no room for a transformer, which was moved forward. The bogie supported its weight.

This was an early electrical era design that used features similar to steam locomotives. The asymmetric axle placement was one. Another was the driver's console location on the right side of the cab. Yet another was the side rods of the Ae 3/6^{II}.

=== Electrical ===
The pneumatically-operated pantographs collected 15 kV AC power from the catenary wire. This was next fed to an oil-filled main switch, and thence to the transformer, located above the bogie. The transformer provided a range of voltages for motor and auxiliary equipment power.

== Operating details ==
Until around 1928, all members of the series had brown livery. In later years, they were repainted in green.

Experience with the series' operating characteristics gradually led to raising their maximum operating speeds to 100 km/h. Modifications to Ae 3/6^{I} members to increase motive power and improve cornering yielded operating speeds of 110 km/h for service between Geneva and Zurich.

The Ae 3/6^{III} was built to remedy running defects of the Ae 3/5 locomotives. SBB believed that the longer front bogie would improve the locomotive’s cornering characteristics. It did not help. Eventually better track maintenance led to smoother running, but this model was considered the least successful by the SBB and its speed was limited to 90 km/h.

None of the models had multiple unit capability.

Due to the higher placement of the motors, the Ae 3/6^{II} had better winter running characteristics.

Ae 3/6^{I} and Ae 3/6^{II} locomotives are preserved and managed by the club Swisstrain.

Ae 3/6 class
Model	Number Built	Road Numbers	Years of Operation
I	114	10601 - 10714	1921-1994
II	60	10401 - 10460	1925-1977
III	11	10261 - 10271	1926-1980

== See also ==
- List of stock used by Swiss Federal Railways

== Gallery ==
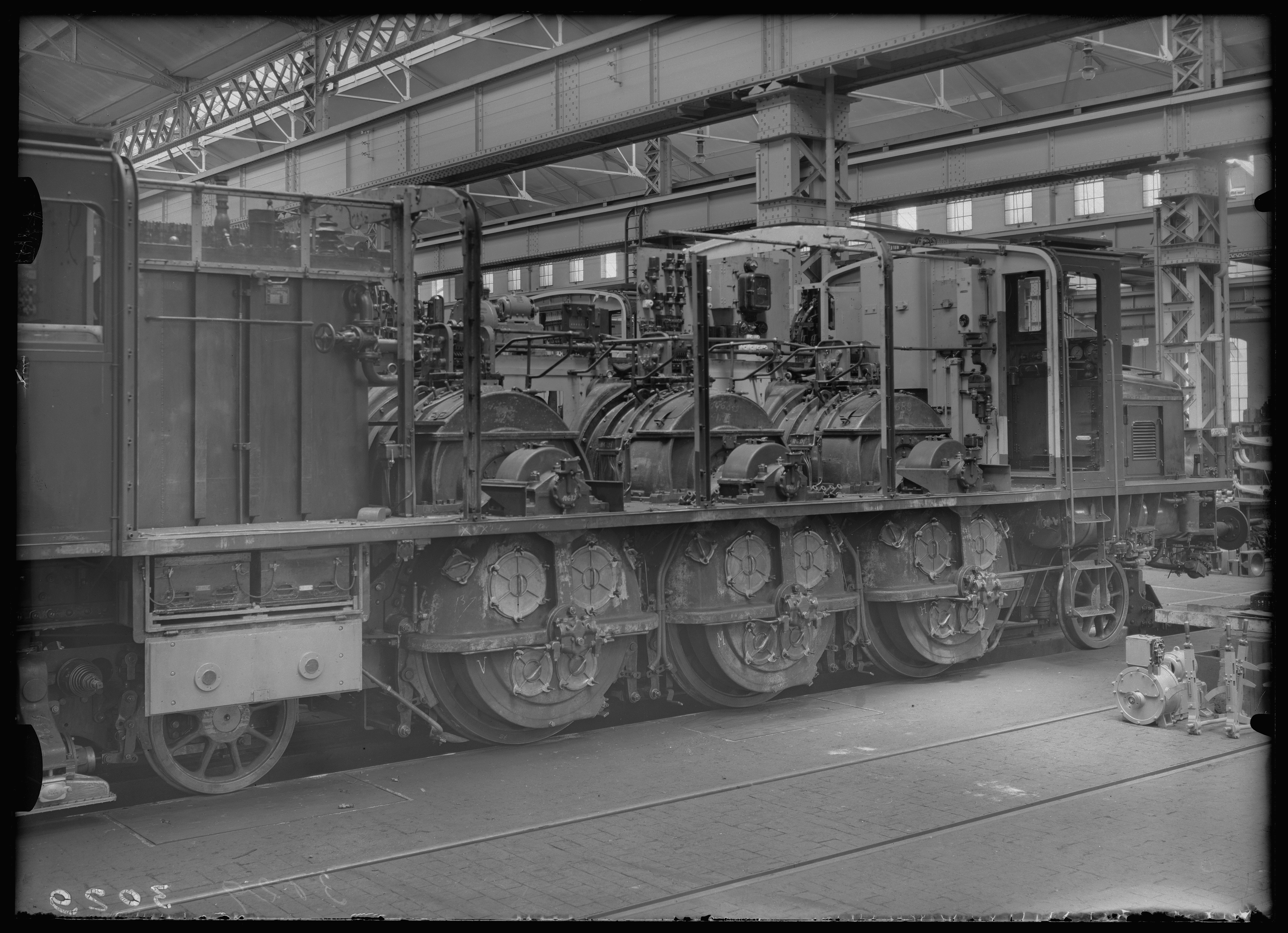
Internal view of Ae 3/6^{I} showing transformer location.

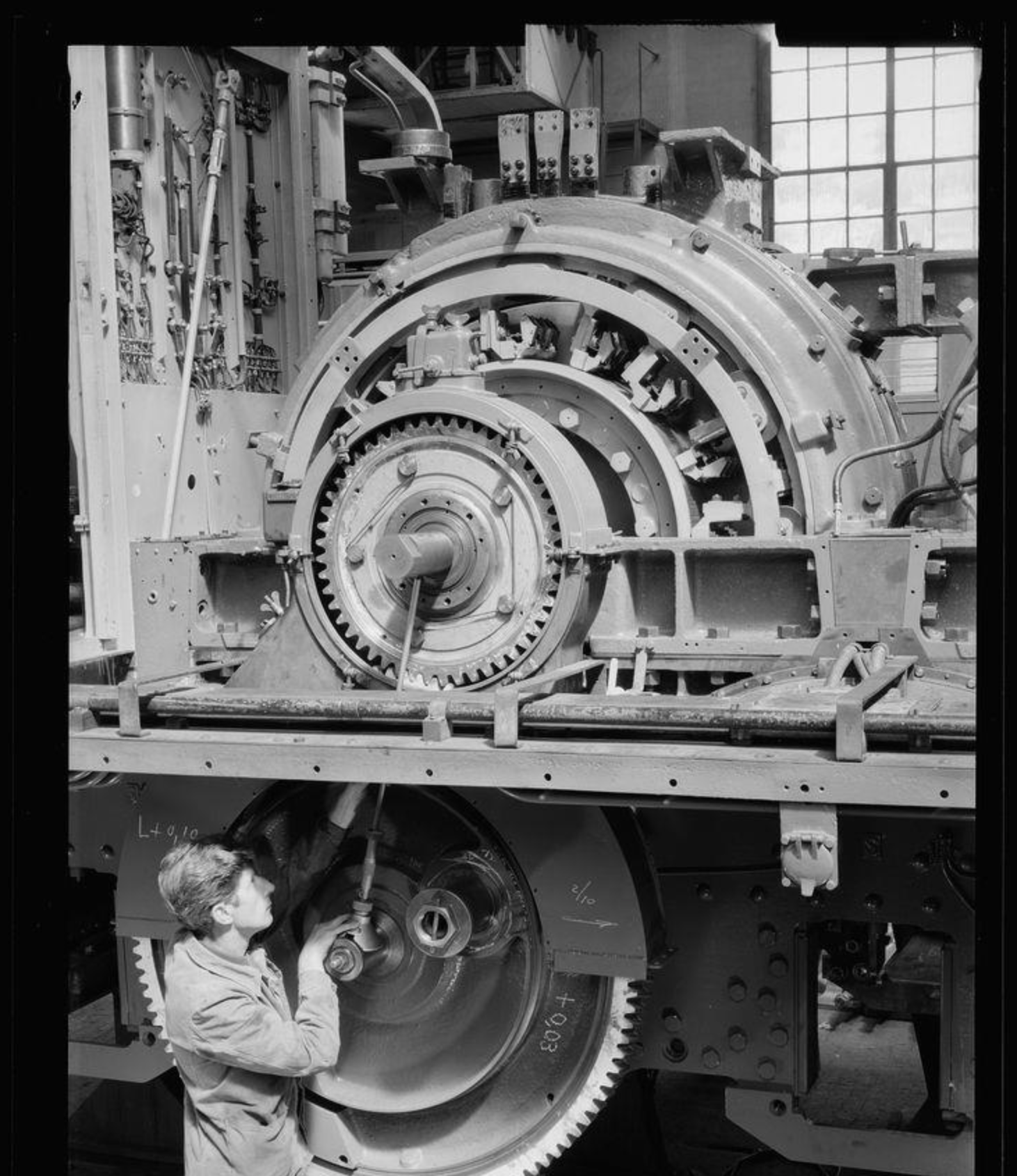
Ae 3/6^{II} nr 10400 construction photo showing motor meshing with countershaft

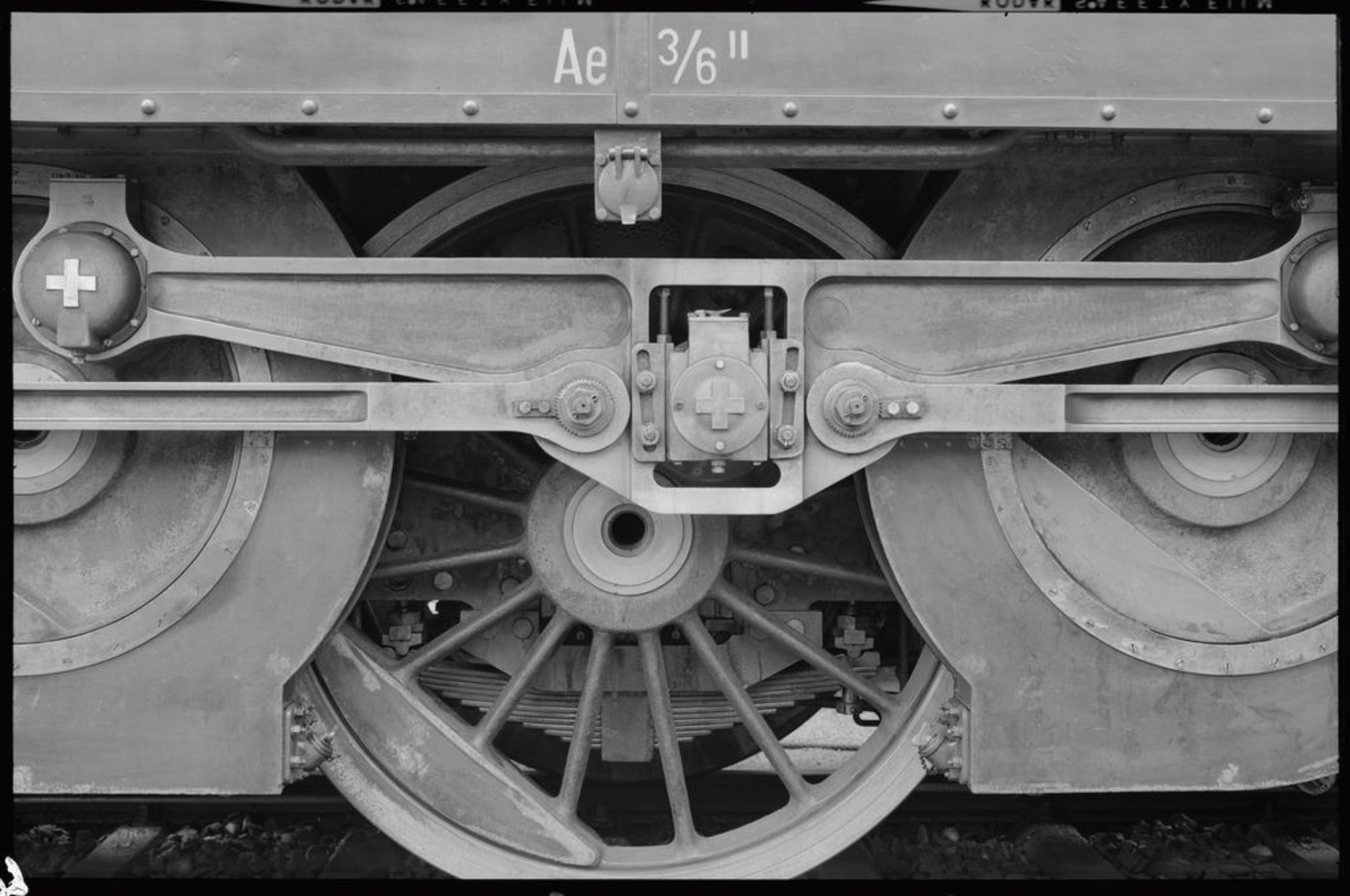
Ae 3/6^{II} nr 10436 countershafts and connecting yoke showing crosshead connection with drive axle and side rods to other driving axles

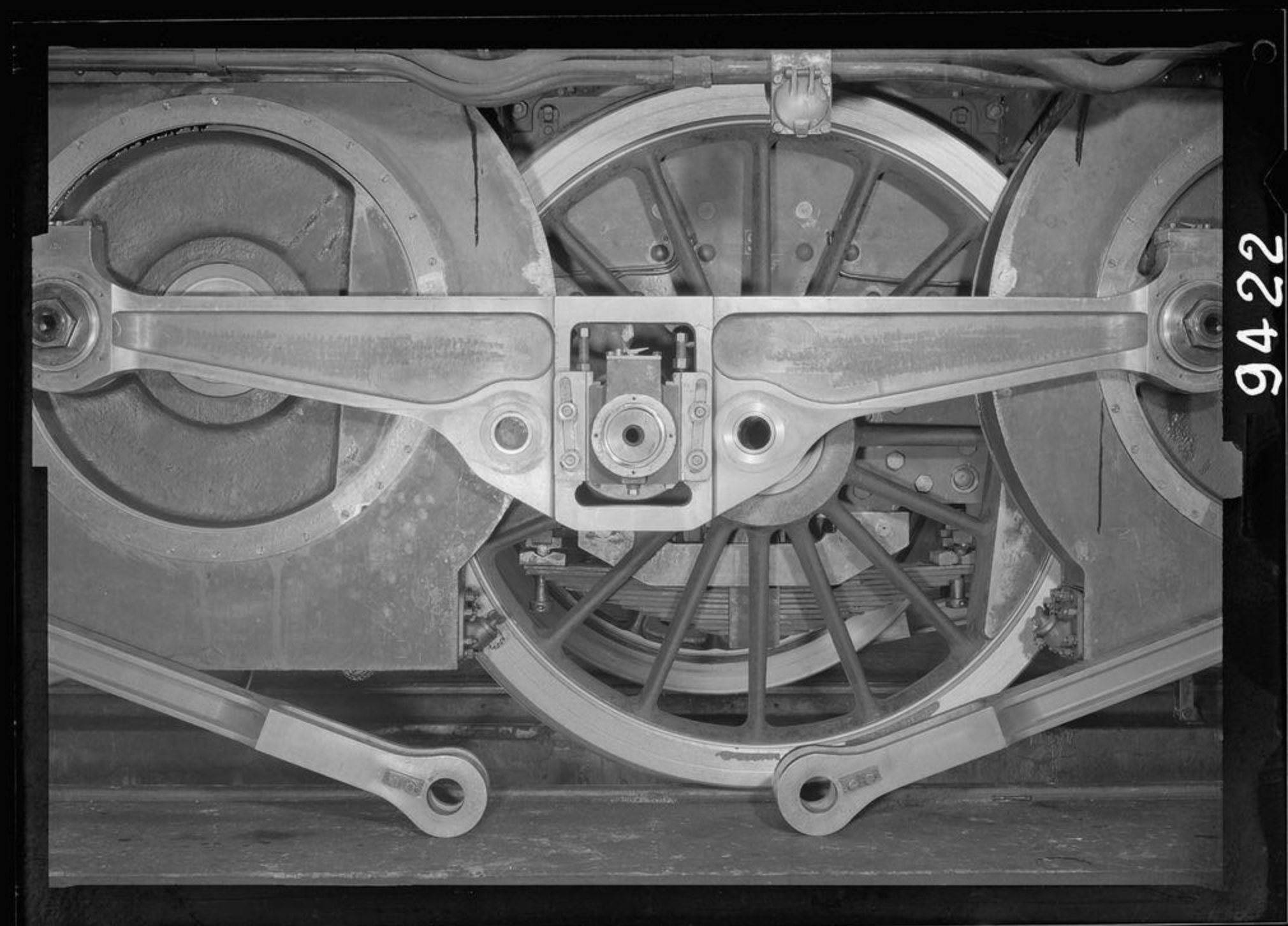
Ae 3/6^{II} nr 10400 countershafts and connecting yoke showing drive axle linkage and side rods (disassembled)
