= Stadler SMILE =

Swiss high-speed train

Stadler SMILE SBB RABe 501 (Giruno)
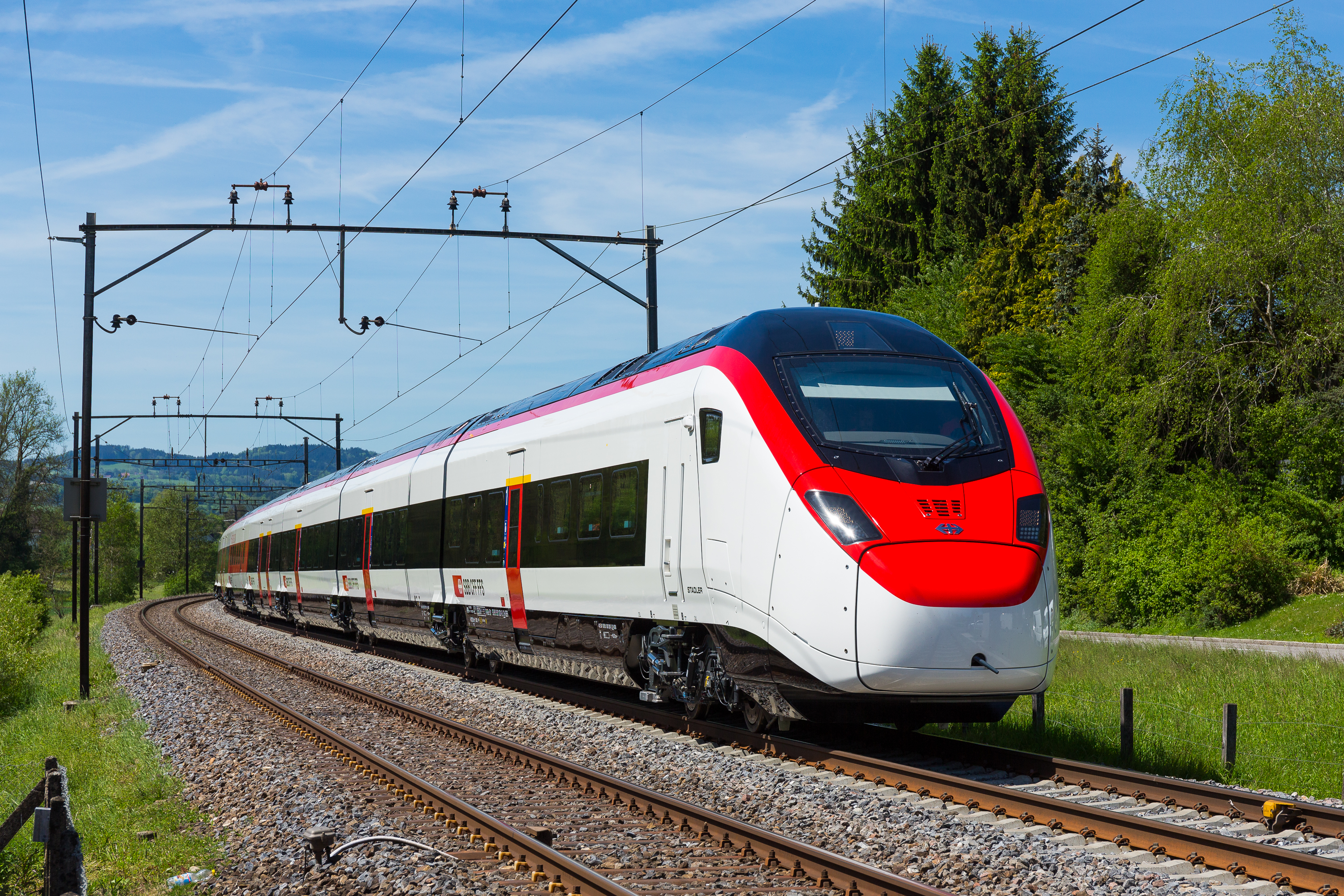
- SBB RABe 501 on test run between Erien and Romanshorn
- Stock type: Electric multiple unit
- In service: 2019–
- Manufacturer: Stadler Rail
- Replaced: RABe 503 (New Pendolino); RABde 500 (ICN)
- Constructed: 2017, 2024– (Commissioning)
- Capacity: 117 1st Class; 286 2nd Class; 4 Wheelchair spaces
- Operators: Swiss Federal Railways; Westbahn

Specifications
- Car body construction: Aluminium
- Train length: 202 m (662 ft 9 in)
- Car length: 22.25 m (73 ft 0 in) (end carriages); 17.5 m (57 ft 5 in) (intermediate carriages)
- Width: 2.9 m (9 ft 6 in)
- Height: 4,255 mm (13 ft 11.5 in)
- Floor height: 940 mm (37 in) (low-floor); 1,150 mm (45 in) (high-floor)
- Wheel diameter: 920–840 mm (36–33 in) (new–worn)
- Wheelbase: 2,700 mm (8 ft 10 in) (end bogies); 2,750 mm (9 ft 0 in) (Jacobs-bogies)
- Maximum speed: 200 or 250 km/h (125 or 155 mph) (Note: 200 km/h (125 mph) (230 km/h (145 mph) if delayed) in Switzerland, 250 km/h (155 mph) outside of Switzerland.)
- Weight: 380 t (370 long tons; 420 short tons) (unladen)
- Traction system: ABB BORDLINE CC1500 MS 25-15-3kV U 1600 059A01 3-level IGBT–VVVF
- Traction motors: 8 × TSA TMF 50-33-4 600 kW (805 hp) asynchronous 3-phase AC
- Power output: 4,800 kW (6,440 hp)
- Tractive effort: 300 kN (67,400 lb_{f})
- Electric systems: 25 kV 50 Hz AC; 15 kV 16 2/3 Hz AC; 3,000 V DC
- Current collection: 1,450 mm (4 ft 9 in) and 1,950 mm (6 ft 5 in) wide pantographs
- UIC classification: 2′(Bo)′(Bo)′(2)′(2)′(2)′(2)′(Bo)′(Bo)′(2)′(2)′2′
- Track gauge: 1,435 mm (4 ft 8 1/2 in) standard gauge

Notes/references
- Sourced from unless otherwise stated.

The Stadler SMILE is a high-speed electric multiple unit train built by Stadler Rail of Switzerland for the Swiss Federal Railways (SBB) and Westbahn from 2017. According to Stadler, it was the world's first single-decker low-floor high-speed train.

The trains replaced the RABe 503 trains on the trans-Alpine route between Milan and Basel / Zurich, and are to be used for further connections to Germany and Austria. The main route goes through the 57 kilometres (35 mi) Gotthard Base Tunnel. As a consequence, the SMILE is also referred to as the "Gotthard train".

The 11-car units operate with a top speed of 250 km/h (155 mph) and can accommodate up to 403 passengers (117 in first class, 286 in second class). Two train sets can be coupled together to accommodate over 800 passengers.

== Name ==
Stadler originally named the train the EC250. This was changed in 2017 to SMILE, short for Schneller Mehrsystemfähiger Innovativer Leichter Expresszug (English: "speedy multi-system innovative lightweight express train").

The Swiss Federal Railways gave the train the class designation RABe 501, (Note: Refer to Swiss locomotive and railcar classification for the designation logic.) and nicknamed the train Giruno (from Girun, Romansh for "buzzard", "bearded vulture" or "kestrel").

== Development ==
In April 2012 the Swiss Federal Railways issued a tender for 29 new single-deck trains capable of reaching 250 km/h (155 mph) for service on routes between Germany, Switzerland and Italy via the then under-construction Gotthard Base Tunnel, the only completely flat route through the Alpine barrier. Bids were placed by Stadler Rail, Siemens, Alstom and Talgo. All four bids were rejected by the SBB and a second round took place, at which point Siemens withdrew. On 9 May 2014 SBB announced an order worth 980,000,000 Swiss francs for 29 Stadler EC250s. The final signing was delayed, however, as Alstom and Talgo both launched legal challenges: Alstom withdrew theirs in September 2014, while the Spain-based Talgo's complaint – that SBB gave the domestic producer an advantage – was dismissed by the Federal Administrative Court in October 2014. The final contract was signed between SBB and Stadler on 30 October 2014.

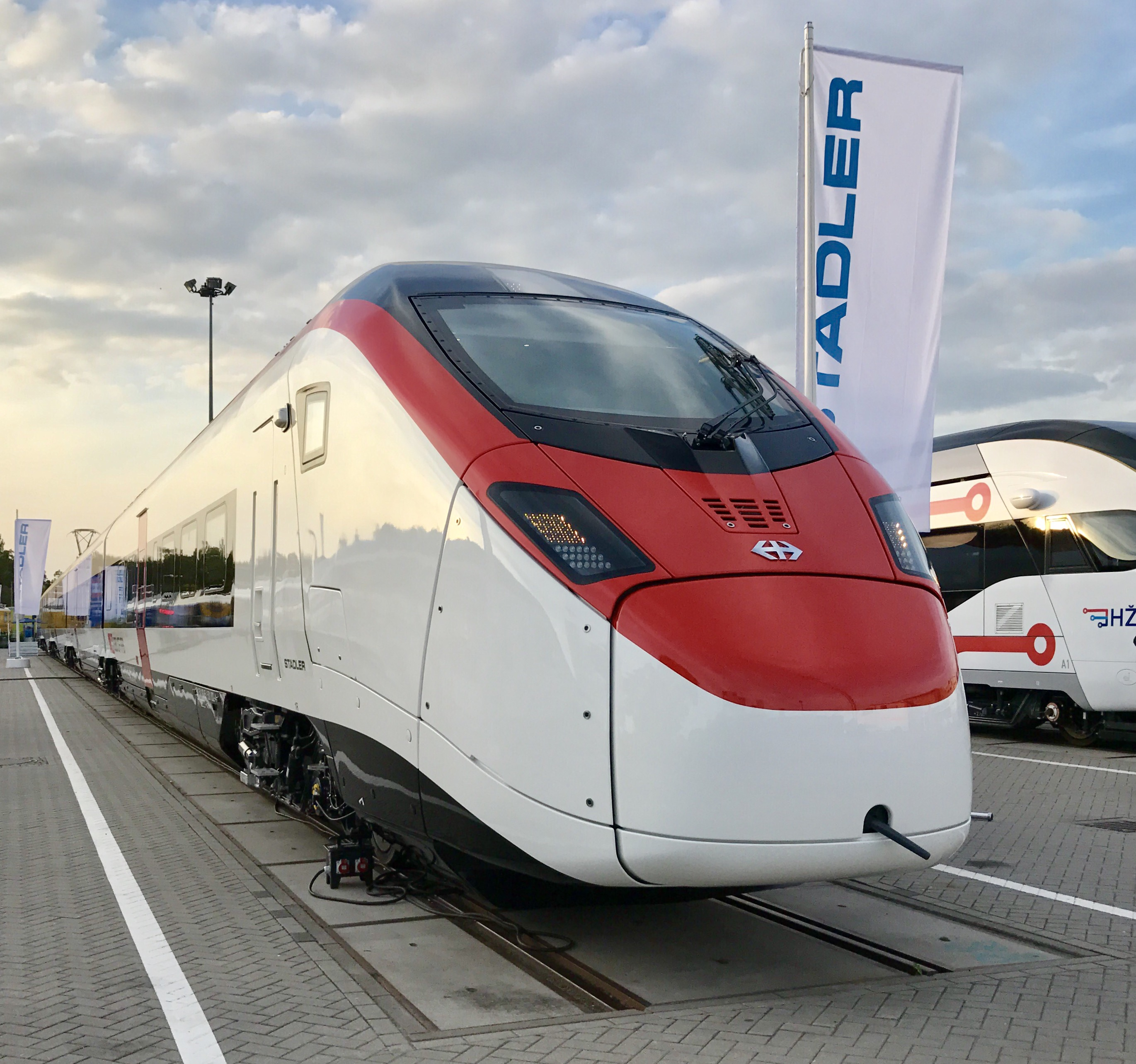
The EC250 at InnoTrans 2016 in Berlin

The EC250's first public appearance – as a short 5-car set – was at InnoTrans 2016 in Berlin, by Stadler CEO, Peter Spuhler, and SBB CEO, Andreas Meyer. The first full 11-car set was presented at a ceremony in Bussnang on 18 May 2017, which was also attended by the then Swiss President Doris Leuthard. Shortly afterwards in August, the EC250 was renamed as SMILE following a public competition.

As SBB intend to operate these trains across several countries, testing had to be carried out in Germany, Italy and Austria, in addition to Switzerland. In early April 2018, a test train unit ran through the Gotthard Tunnel at 275 km/h (171 mph) in order to meet approval conditions to operate up to 250 km/h (155 mph) on the line. The Federal Office of Transport approved this service for Switzerland on 4 April 2019 and the European Union Railway Agency approved it for Italy in March 2020 – in both cases, for speeds up to 200 km/h (125 mph).

The first passenger revenue service operated between Zurich and Erstfeld on 8 May 2019, using Giruno unit 501 006.

== Design ==
The EC250 is designed to comply with the TSI-High-speed regulations and meets the EN 15227 crashworthiness standards.

The cars are connected to Jacobs bogies and the propulsion system consists of four motorised bogies, powered from four roof-mounted electric current collectors. The electrification system is compatible with the Swiss and German 15 kV 16 2/3 Hz AC overhead power supplies, as well as with Italian 3,000 V DC and 25 kV 50 Hz AC electrification systems. The motorized bogies are reportedly capable of generating a maximum power output of 6000 kW.

Each 11-car train set is 200 metres (656 ft 2 in) long and has an empty weight of 380 tonnes (840,000 lb). Each carriage has a width of 2.9 m (9 ft 6 in) and a height of 4.25 m (13 ft 11 in). The wheelbase of the unpowered bogies is 2.7 m (8 ft 10 in), while those of the motorised bogies are 2.75 m (9 ft 0 in). The carriages do not have a uniform floor height as the seats at either end of each car are positioned above the bogies while the central aisle rises towards the carriage connection through ramps.

The low-floor entrances allow step-free access from platforms at heights between 550 mm (22 in) and 760 mm (30 in) and several accessible toilets and areas for wheelchairs are available, allowing the train to comply with the Law on Equal Rights for Persons with Disabilities. As a long-distance train, it also features signal boosters for 3G/4G cellular phone networks, power sockets (for Swiss and international plugs) and large luggage racks for passenger comfort, along with energy-efficient lighting. The interior is flexible, meaning it can be extensively refitted and modified to an operator's requirements.

== Service ==
=== Swiss Federal Railways - Switzerland ===
The Giruno units operate services from Basel and Zurich to Chiasso and Lugano. Services between Zurich and Milan have also operated since 12 August 2020, and have later expanded to Venice, Genoa and Bologna. The Giruno replaced existing RABDe 500 (ICN) and tilting ETR 610 units on the Gotthard railway, which were reassigned to more winding Alpine routes such as the Jura Foot Railway.

Each of the 41 trainsets, which were delivered by December 2025, is numbered and named. Twenty-six are named after the cantons of Switzerland, but the numbering deviates from that of the "Gotthard locomotives". Two are named after the Italian regions of Liguria and Lombardy, one is named after the commune of Monteceneri (because of the Ceneri Base Tunnel), one after the Saint-Gotthard Massif and one after the Simplon Pass. The names are indicated at both ends of the train and inside the dining car.

==== Orders and deliveries ====
- First batch:
  - Order for 29 trainsets (option for 92 trains) signed in October 2014, worth CHF 970 million.
  - Entry into service: from 2019 to 2021.
- Second batch:
  - Order for 7 trainsets signed in June 2022, worth CHF 250 million.
  - Entry into service: from 2024 to 2025.
- Third batch:
  - Order for 5 trainsets signed in February 2024, worth CHF 170 million.
  - Entry into service: 2025.

==== List of named RABe 501 trainsets ====
Trainsets list
| № | Name | № | Name | № | Name |
|---|---|---|---|---|---|
| RABe 501 001 | Ticino | RABe 501 015 | St. Gallen | RABe 501 029 | Simplon |
| RABe 501 002 | Aargau | RABe 501 016 | Glarus | RABe 501 030 | Lombardia (without coat of arms) |
| RABe 501 003 | San Gottardo (coat of arms created by SBB) | RABe 501 017 | Fribourg | RABe 501 031 | Liguria (without coat of arms) |
| RABe 501 004 | Schwyz | RABe 501 018 | Appenzell Ausserrhoden | RABe 501 032 | Veneto (without coat of arms) |
| RABe 501 005 | Nidwalden | RABe 501 019 | Appenzell Innerrhoden | RABe 501 033 | Emilia-Romagna (without coat of arms) |
| RABe 501 006 | Obwalden | RABe 501 020 | Luzern | RABe 501 034 | Hessen (without coat of arms) |
| RABe 501 007 | Uri | RABe 501 021 | Graubünden | RABe 501 035 | Freie und Hansestadt Hamburg (without coat of arms) |
| RABe 501 008 | Monteceneri | RABe 501 022 | Vaud | RABe 501 036 | Toscana (without coat of arms) |
| RABe 501 009 | Zürich | RABe 501 023 | Valais | RABe 501 037 | Baden-Württemberg (without coat of arms) |
| RABe 501 010 | Basel-Landschaft | RABe 501 024 | Neuchâtel | RABe 501 038 | Niedersachsen (without coat of arms) |
| RABe 501 011 | Thurgau | RABe 501 025 | Genève | RABe 501 039 | Trentino-Südtirol (without coat of arms) |
| RABe 501 012 | Solothurn | RABe 501 026 | Basel-Stadt | RABe 501 040 | Vorarlberg (without coat of arms) |
| RABe 501 013 | Zug | RABe 501 027 | Schaffhausen | RABe 501 041 | Tirol (without coat of arms) |
| RABe 501 014 | Bern | RABe 501 028 | Jura | | |

SBB RABe 501 Giruno

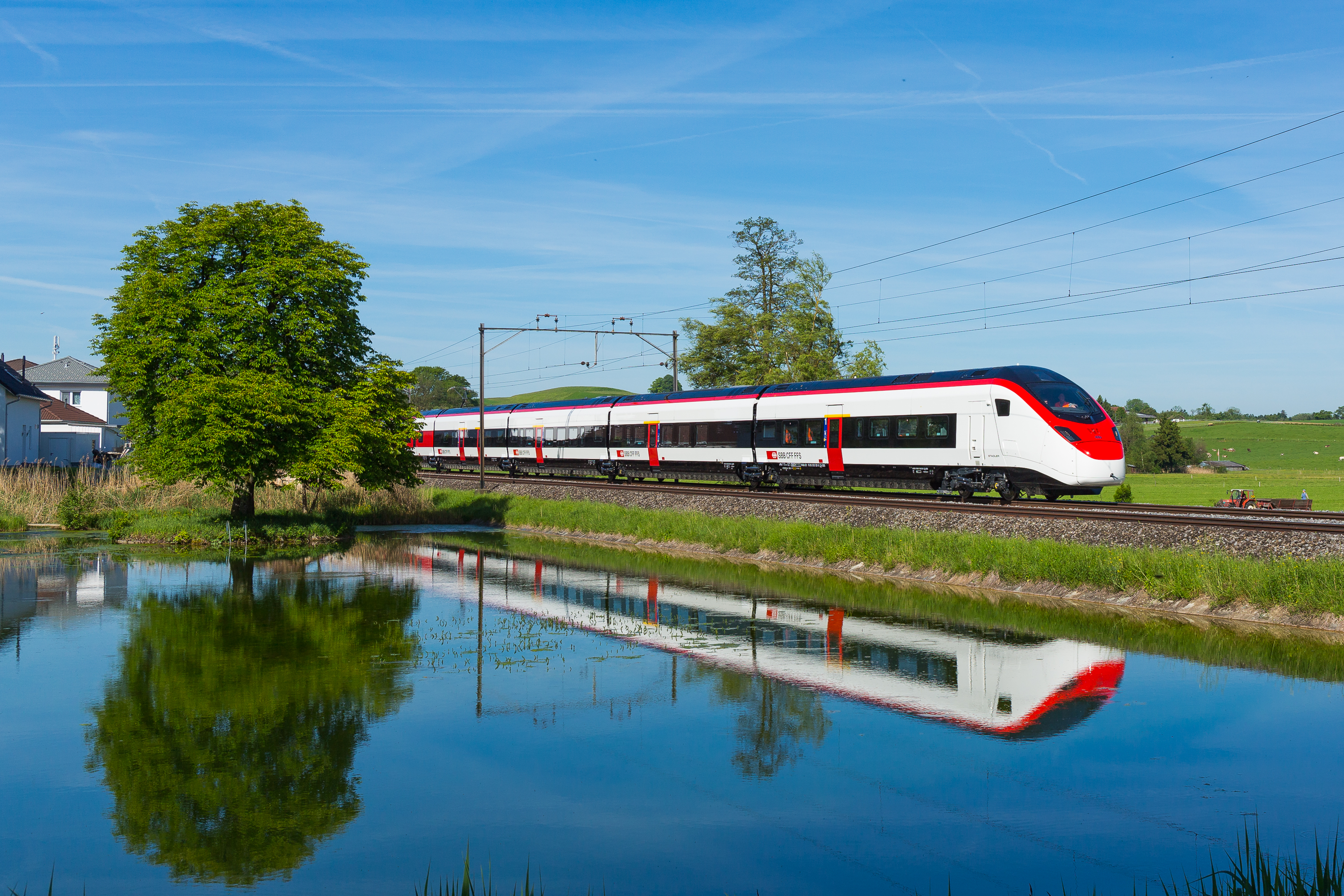
Testing near Erlen, 2017

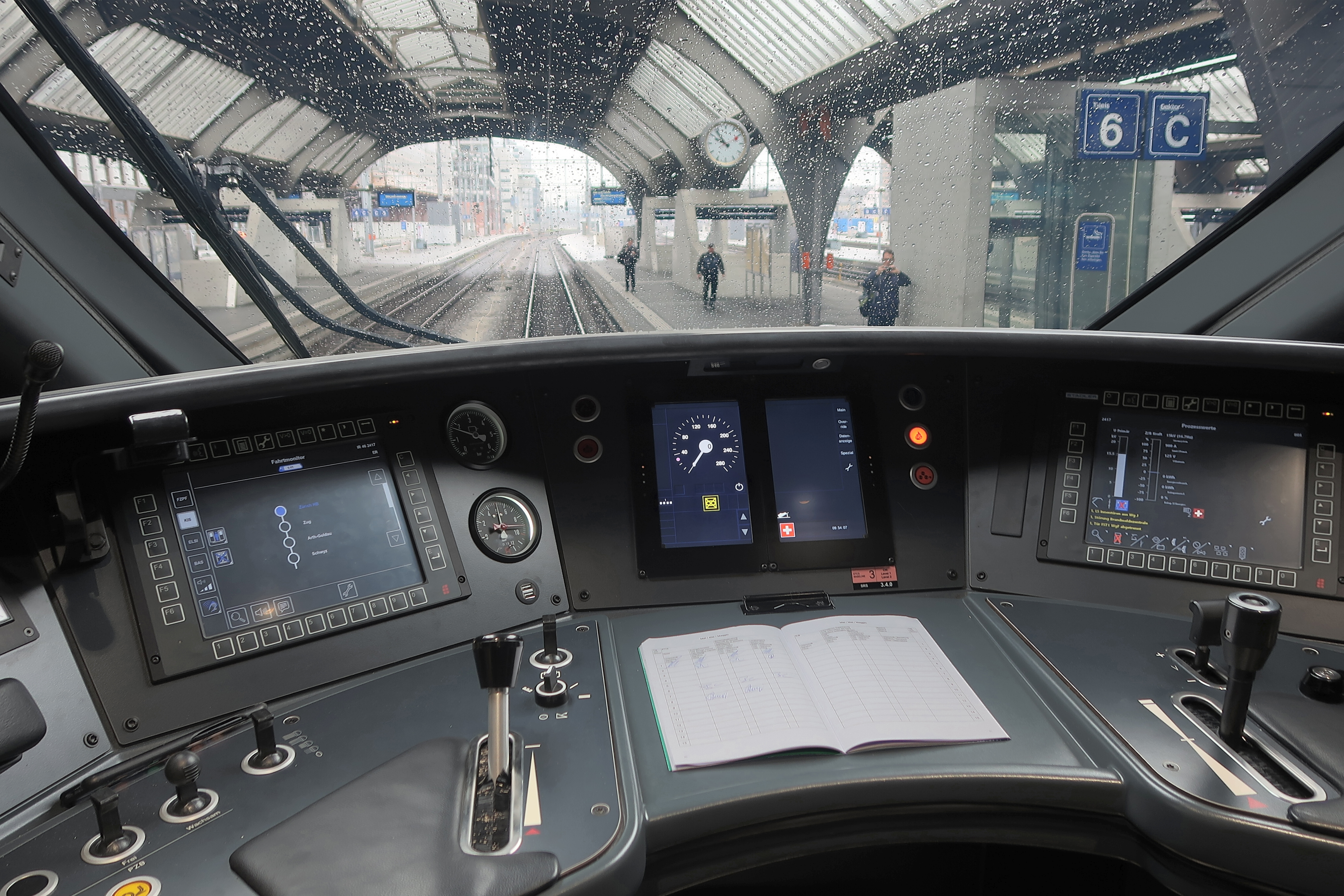
Cab view

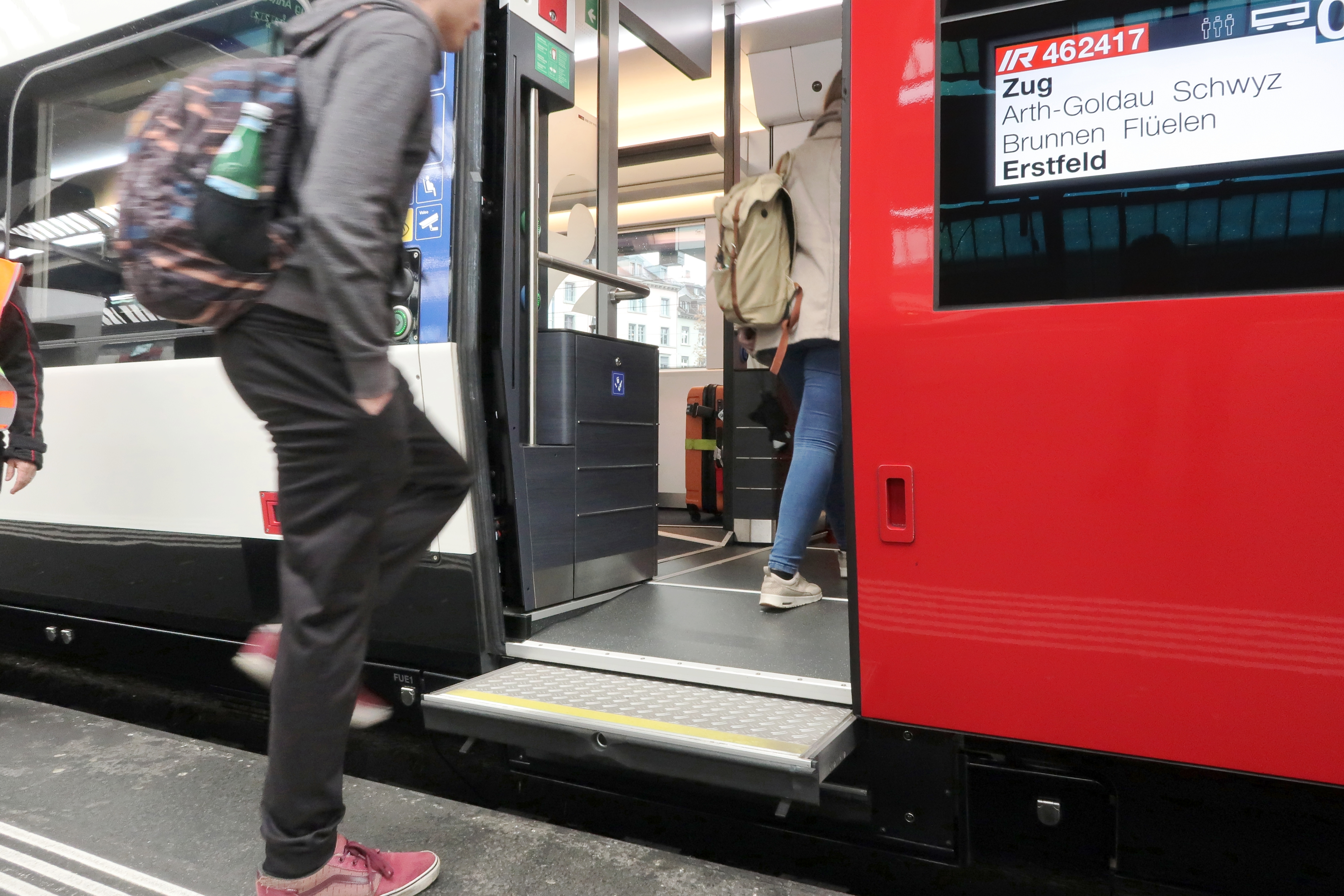
At Zurich in 2019 showing level entrances for both 550mm Swiss platform height and 760mm German platform height

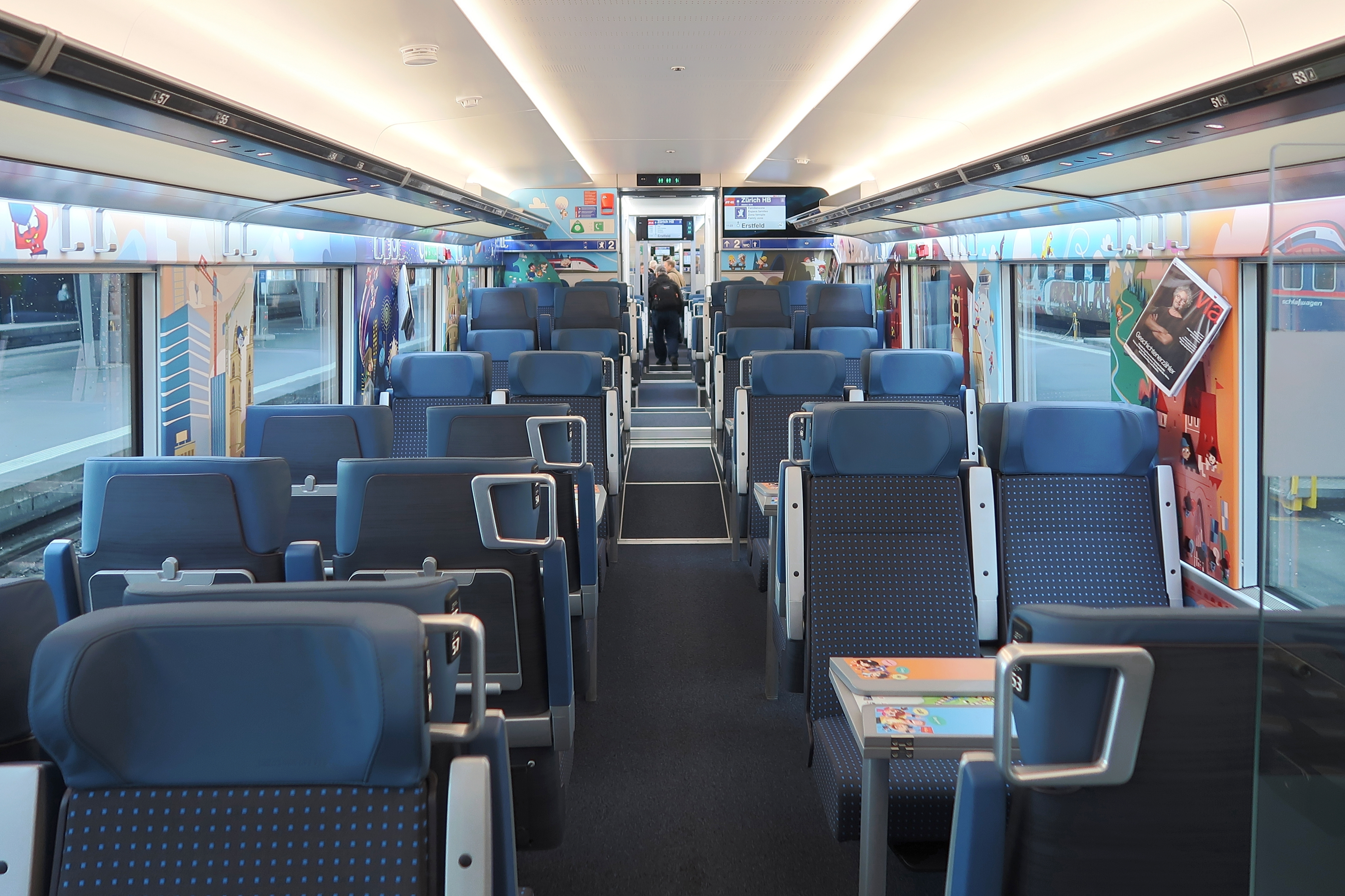
Second class interior, showing the raised seats and ramps at the end of the carriage

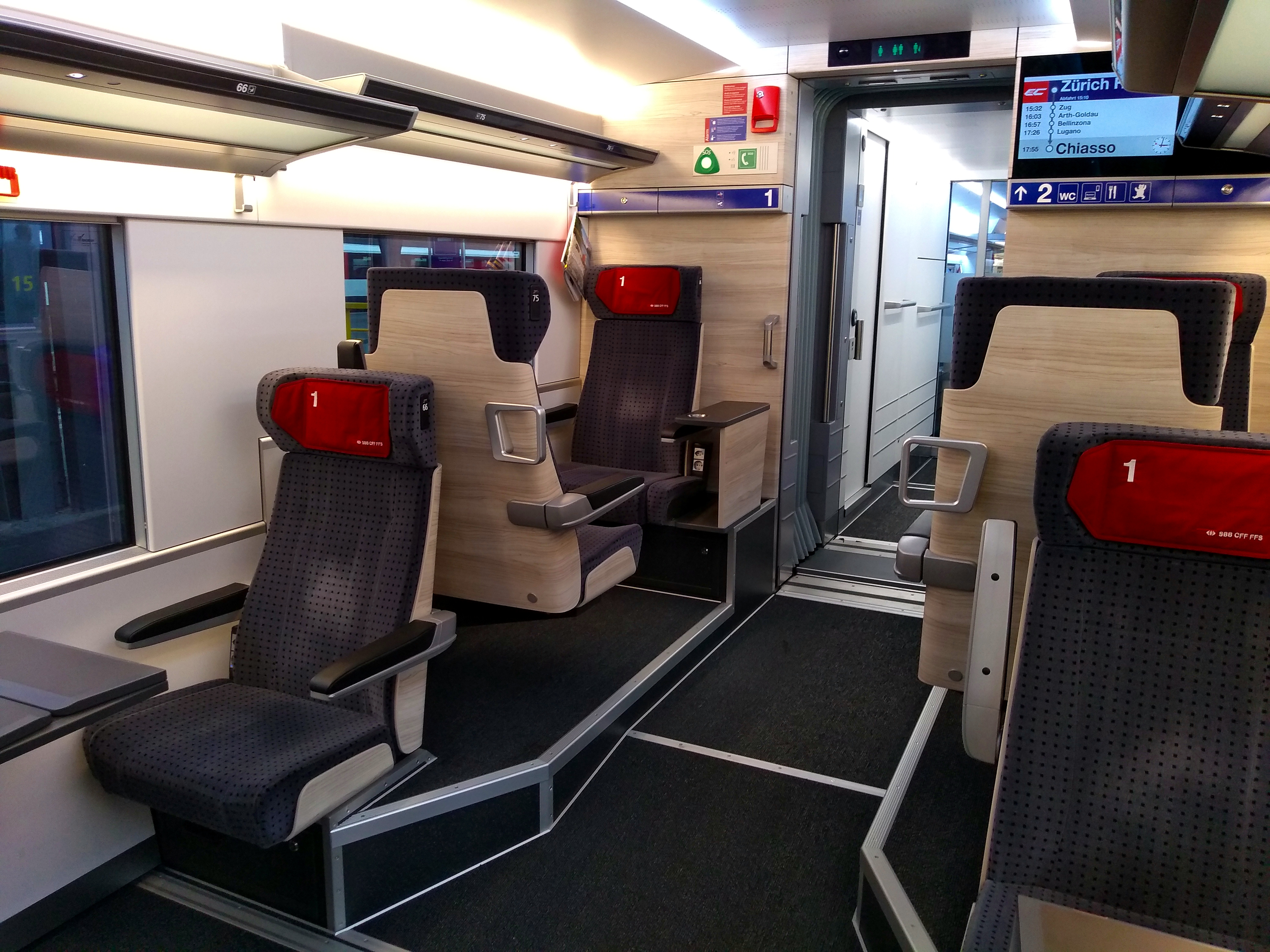
First class Giruno interior

=== Westbahn - Austria ===
Westbahn's order of 3 SMILE trainsets was signed in March 2025. The first trainset entered in service in March 2026 on the Vienna - Graz - Klagenfurt - Villach route. The trainsets are being leased.

Stadler SMILE of WESTbahn

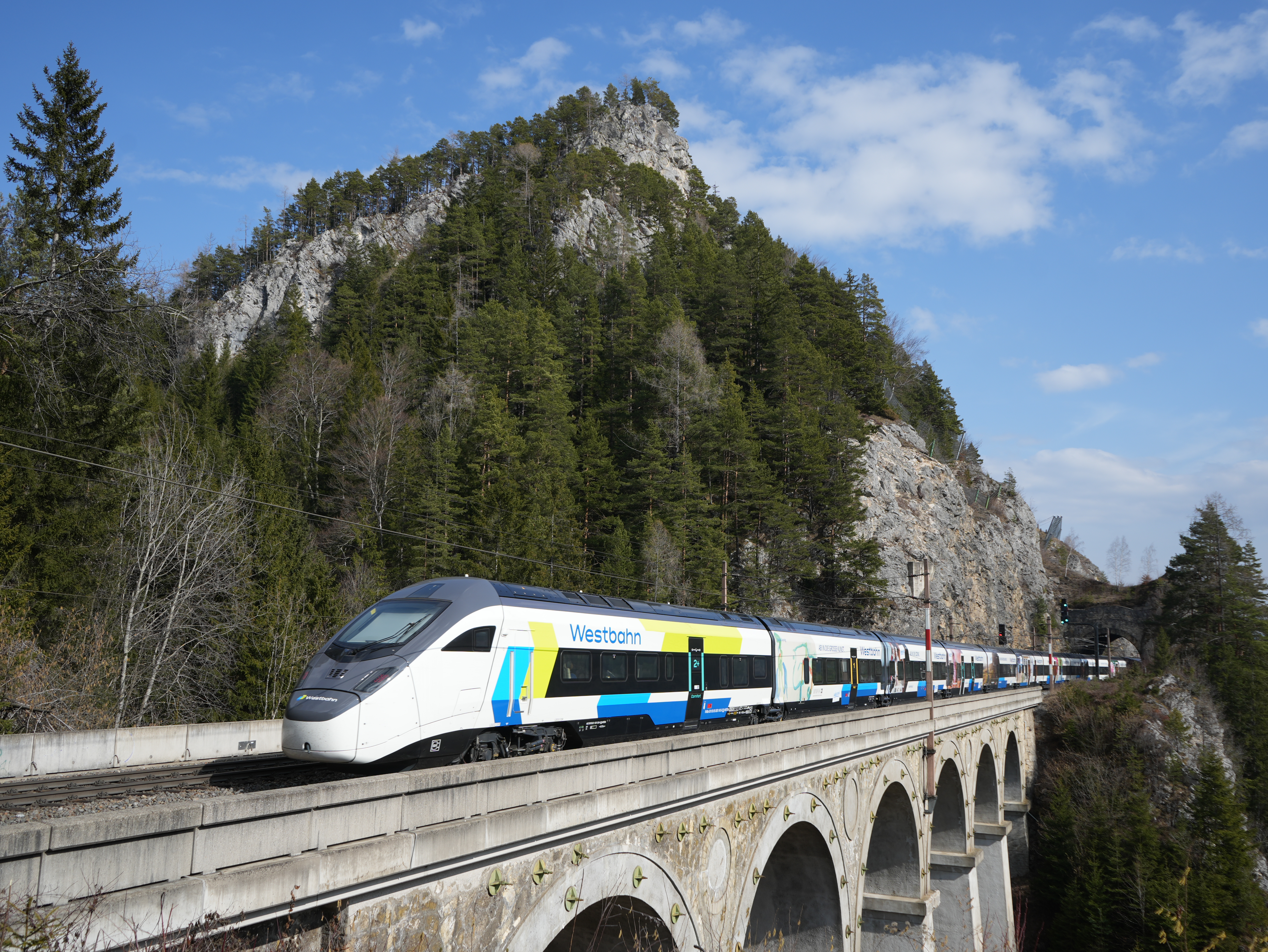
On the Semmeringbahn, 2026

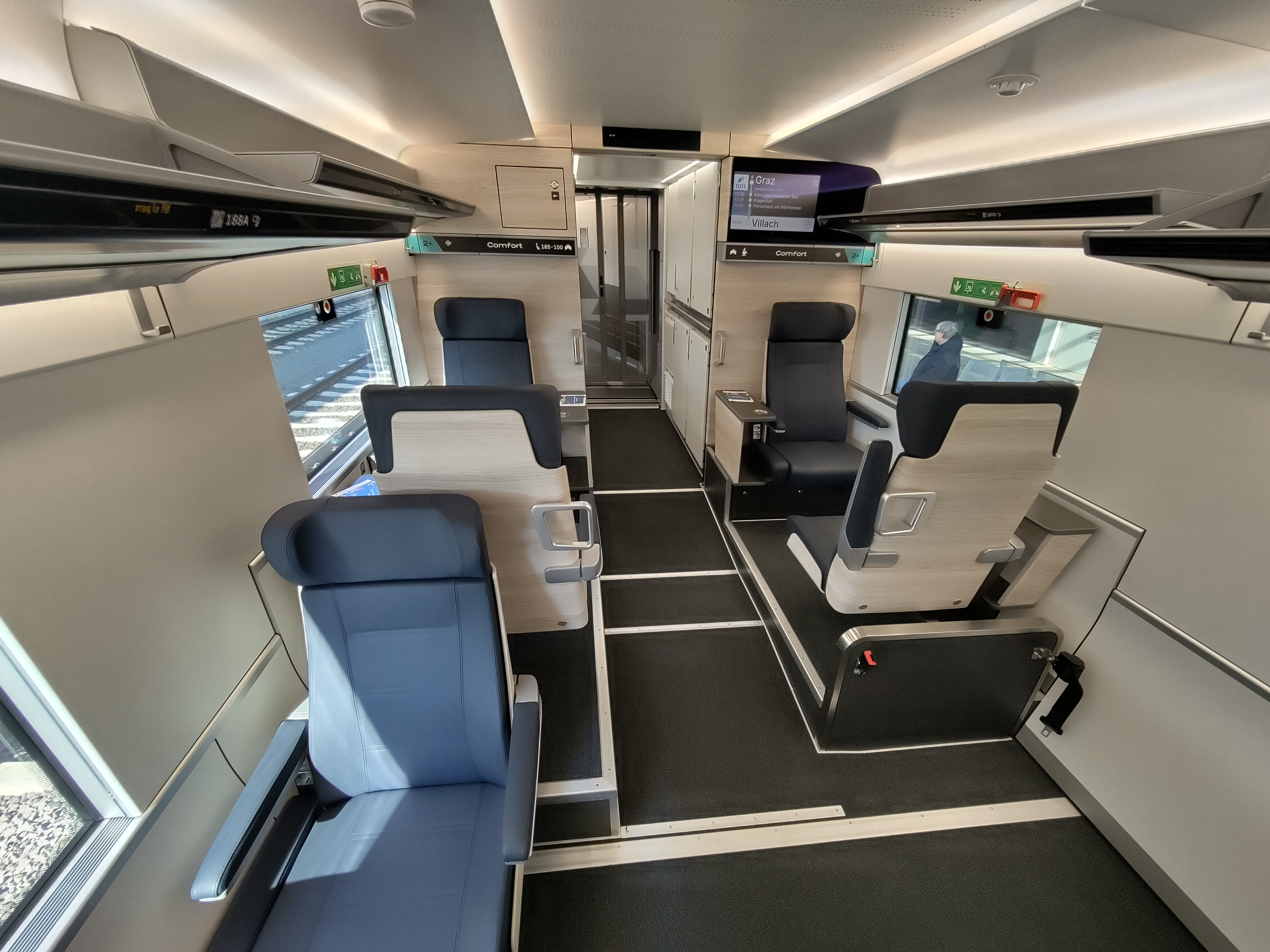
Comfort-class interior

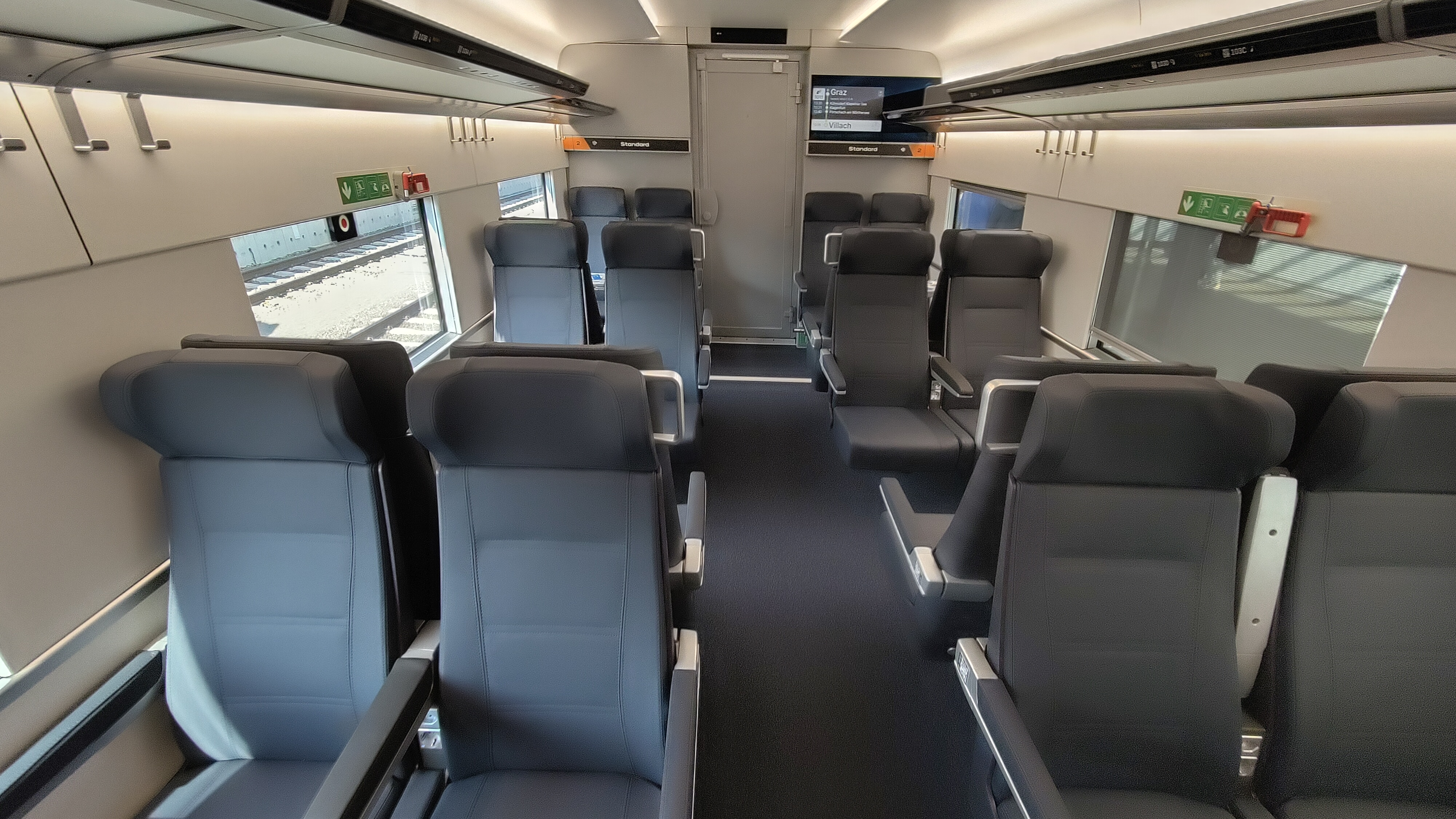
Standard-class interior

=== Saudi Arabia Railways - Saudi Arabia ===
A derivative of the SMILE was sold to the Saudi Arabia Railways in February 2024. The contract is for 10 trainsets with an option for 10 additional ones (CHF 600 million). Artist's impressions depicted a train using the same cab as the Giruno. It differs from the Swiss-Austrian variant as it is powered by two diesel-electric power units.

== See also ==
- List of high speed trains
- Swiss locomotive and railcar classification
- EuroCity
