= Munzinger =

Munzinger is a surname. Notable people with the surname include:

- Ernst Munzinger (1887–1945), German businessman, army officer and National Socialist
- Josef Munzinger (1791–1855), Member of the Swiss Federal Council
- Louis Munzinger (born 1851), New York politician
- Ludwig Munzinger (1877–1957), German encyclopaedist
- Oskar Munzinger (1849–1932), Swiss politician
- Werner Munzinger (1832–1875), Swiss adventurer

== See also ==
- Munzinger-Archiv, German publishing house
