= Mundinger =

Mundinger is a surname. Notable people with the surname include:

- Ellen Mundinger (born 1955), German high jumper
- George Mundinger (1854–1910), American baseball player

== See also ==
- Munzinger
