= Andreas Meyer (business manager) =

Swiss manager and lawyer (born 1961)

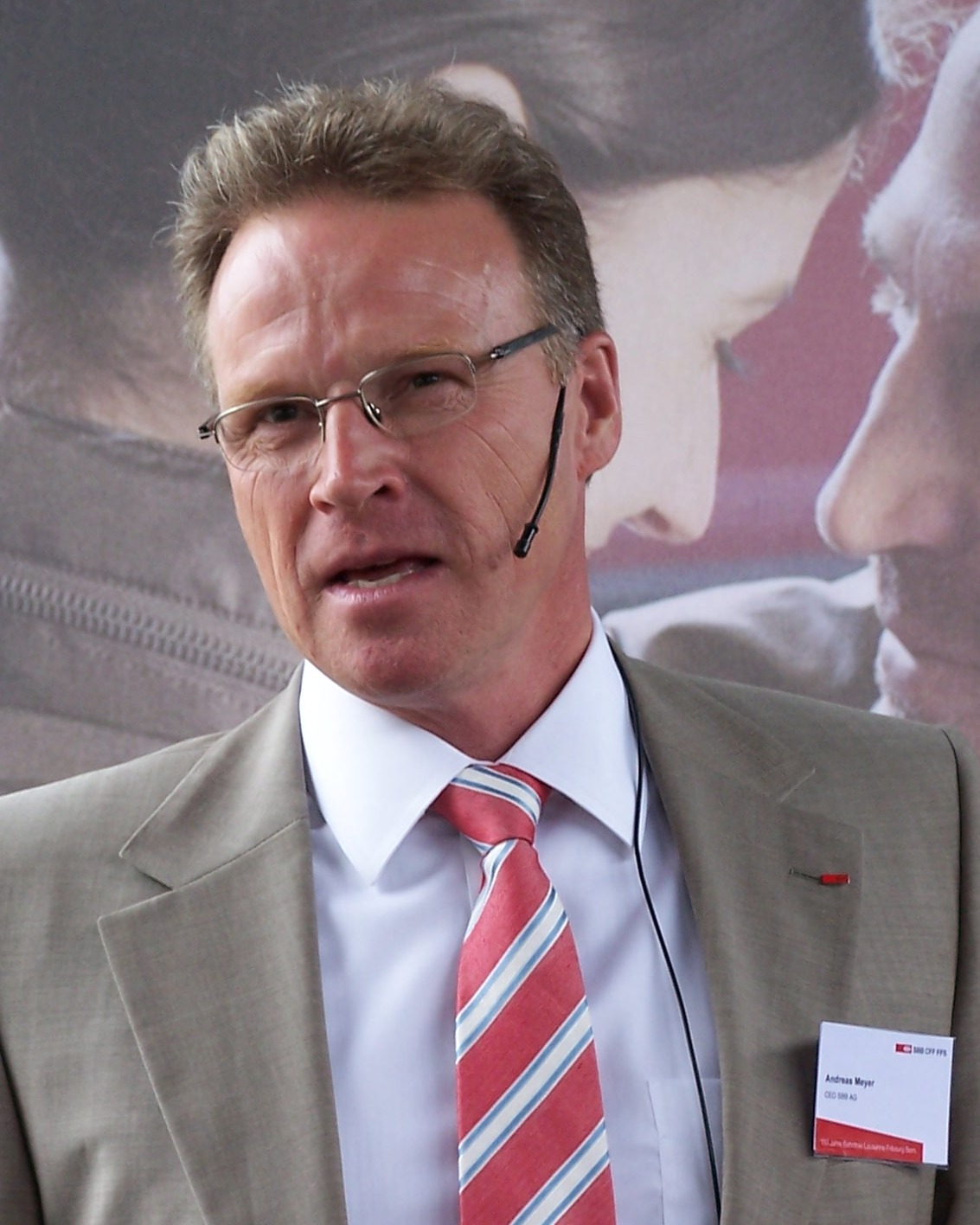
Andreas Meyer

Andreas Meyer (born 9 April 1961, Basel, Switzerland) is a Swiss manager and lawyer. From January 2007 to September 2020, he has been Chairman of the Management Board of the Swiss Federal Railways (SBB). Since October 2020, he serves as president of the board at Starmind.

== Life ==
Andreas Meyer passed his Matura type B at the Gymnasium Muttenz in 1980. He then studied law at the Universities of Basel and Fribourg (Switzerland). In 1989, he completed and passed his lawyer's exams in the Canton of Basel-Landschaft and in 1995 he received an MBA from INSEAD in Fontainebleau.

== Career ==
Meyer began his career as a legal consultant at ABB in 1990, and later as an assistant to the management and project manager at the SBB subsidiary, W + E Environment Technology in Zürich. From 1996 to 1997, he worked as managing director at the German plant construction company, Deutsche Babcock in Oberhausen and Bitterfeld.

From 1997 to 2006, Andreas Meyer worked in various positions at Deutsche Bahn AG. He joined DB Energie as Managing Director and became Chairman of the Management Board in 2000. In 1997, he was entrusted with the task of selling the Energy Saving Party. Through renovations, he was able to convince the concerned group of long-term preservation of the Energy Division of the DB Group. In 2004, he became Chairman of the Management Board of DB Stadtverkehr. At the same time, he was also a member of the Executive Board of DB Personenverkehr. From 2005, Meyer was also a member of the Deutsche Bahn AG‘s Executive Board.

On 23 June 2006, Meyer, with effect from 1 January 2007, was unanimously elected by SBB's Board of Directors, from 30 candidates, to succeed Benedikt Weibel. Ten of the candidates had extensive interviews. In the 2014 fiscal year, he received a fixed salary of CHF 580,000, as well as a performance-related share of CHF 492,000. With a total of around CHF 1.1 million as income, Meyer is therefore the highest-paid employee in a company owned by the Swiss Confederation. In 1996, the total income for SBB CEO Benedikt Weibel was CHF 300,000.

In June 2011, Meyer was relieved to be able to confirm the phasing out of the Cisalpino Pendolino which would be phased out by the end of 2014, meaning the end its nerve wrecking journey which had become a "horror" because of constant breakdowns and delays and subsequent loss of reliability.

On 4 September 2019, Meyer announced his resignation from the top management of SBB by the end of 2020 at the latest. Following the election of his successor, the SBB Board of Directors accepted his departure and transfer of office as of 1 April 2020. In March 2020, as a result of the coronavirus pandemic, Meyer had to address a fall of up to 80% of passenger numbers which resulted in the "biggest timetable change in the history" of public transport. In the midst of the Corona crisis, Vincent Ducrot, became the new head of SBB and, on 1 April 2020, took over from Meyer who had been head of SBB since 2007.

In 2019, before retiring from their respective chief executive positions, Meyer and Thomas Klühr of Swiss, entered into the strategic business partnership "Swiss Air Rail" which combined train journeys with flights.

== Controversy ==
As a result of Meyers's change of position from Deutsche Bahn to SBB, there was controversy about his income in 2008. Within SBB's 2007 annual report, it was shown that Meyer had received an additional bonus on top of his bonus and an extraordinary contribution to the pension fund: SBB Immobilien acquired Meyers German residence and organized its sale to facilitate his change of location. In addition to the media and public debates surrounding this decision, a parliamentary inquiry was initiated by the member of National Council Josef Zisyadis. Meyer's salary was a frequently discussed topic and sparked political discussions about the level of salaries paid to chief executives of federal companies. It made headlines again in March 2021, when SBB's annual account showed Meyer's final 2020 salary as almost 715,000 francs, which was equivalent to his remuneration for the previous year despite him leaving office after just three months but taking into consideration his one-year notice period until end of September 2020. It also revealed that Meyer's salary for 2020 was considerably higher than his successor's, who, like other SBB chief executives, had agreed to waive variable salary components amounting to about 10% of their salary.

== Family ==
Andreas Meyer is married, a father of three children and lives in Muri bei Bern. He grew up together with his brother in a railroad family in Birsfelden in Basel. His father worked as SBB wagon master and later as head of the SBB depot Muttenz in Basel. Meyer became familiar with the SBB from an early age. He accompanied his father as a boy to the Rhine port, where he checked wagon loads and carried out brake tests. During his law studies, he worked as a cleaner in the SBB wagons.

== Literature ==
- Andreas Meyer, in the Munzinger-Archiv
