= Swiss Federal Railways =

National railway company of Switzerland

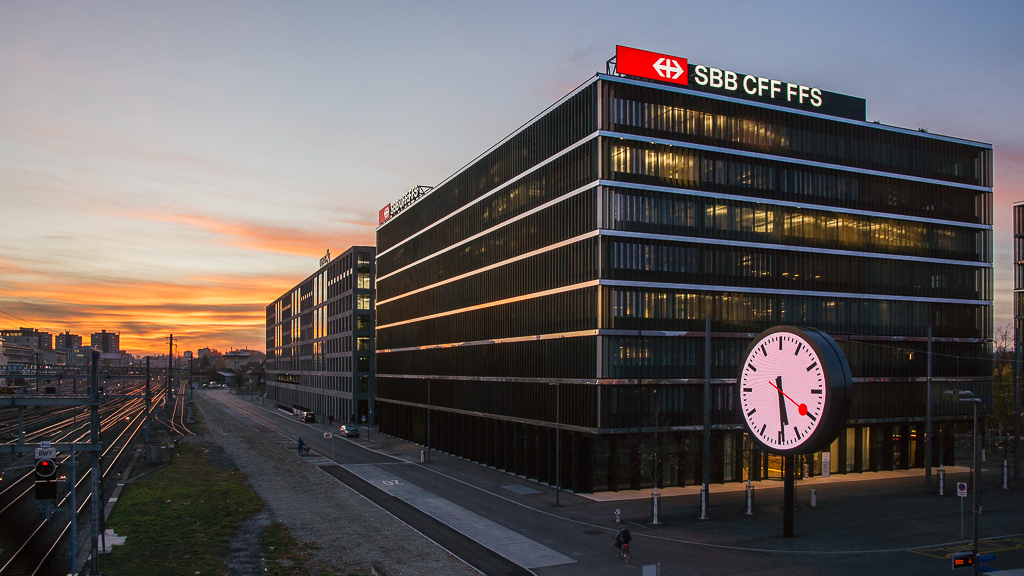
- Head office in Bern
- Native name: Schweizerische Bundesbahnen SBB (German); Chemins de fer fédéraux suisses CFF (French); Ferrovie federali svizzere FFS (Italian); Viafiers federalas svizras VFS (Romansh) (Note: Although it is the abbreviation "VFS" that is registered in the commercial register of the canton of Bern, it is not used in federal documents and laws in Romansh.)
- Type: State-owned AG/SA regulated by public law
- Industry: Rail transport
- Founded: 1 January 1902; 124 years ago
- Headquarters: Bern, Switzerland
- Key people: Vincent Ducrot, CEO; Monika Ribar, chairperson of the board of directors
- Revenue: ▲CHF 11.406 billion (2024)
- Net income: ▲CHF 275 million (2024)
- Total assets: ▲CHF 56.412 billion (2024)
- Total equity: ▼CHF 11.012 billion (2024)
- Number of employees: ▲35,569 (2024, FTE)
- Divisions: Passenger, SBB Cargo, Infrastructure, Real Estate
- Website: sbb.ch

SBB rail network
- SBB network (for the whole Swiss railway network see: Rail transport in Switzerland)

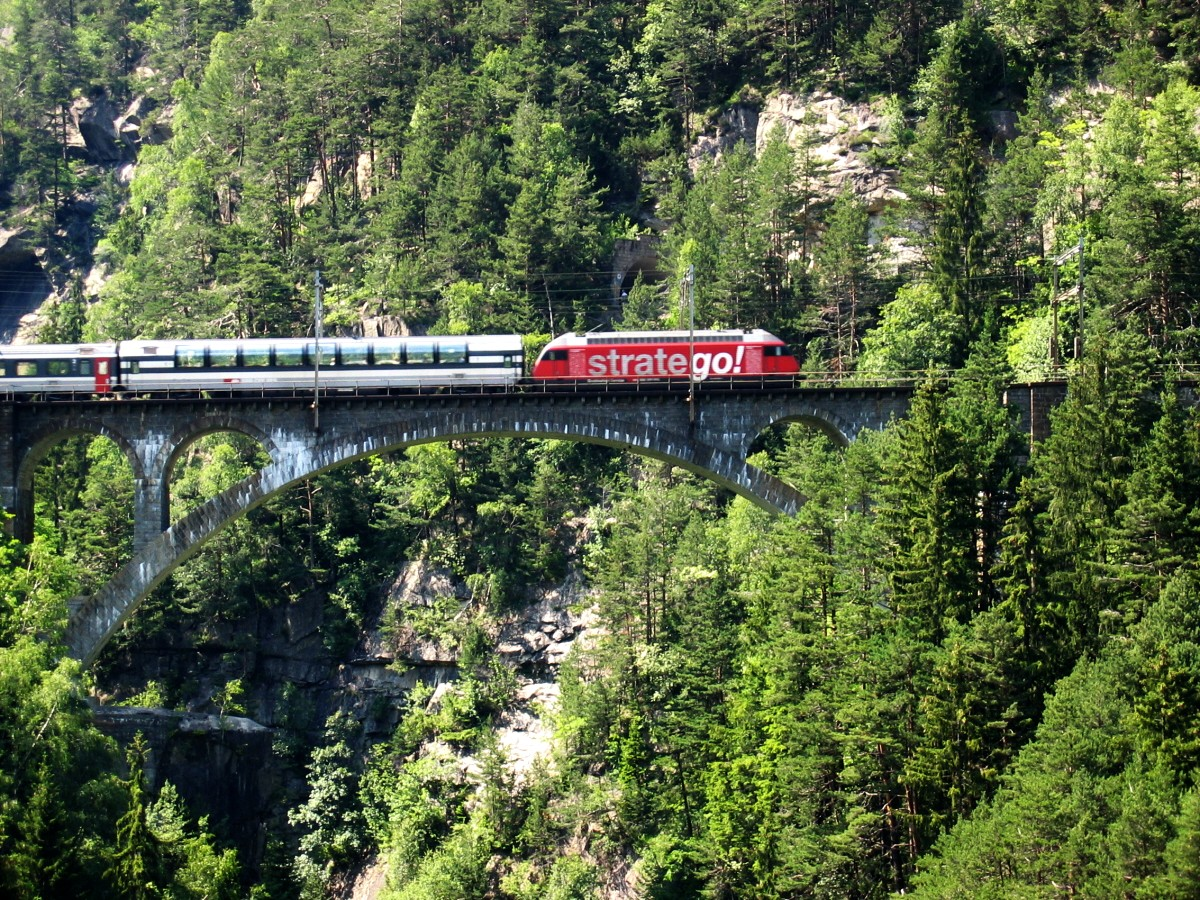
- InterCity train on the old Gotthard Line

Overview
- Dates of operation: 1 January 1902–present

Technical
- Track gauge: 1,435 mm (4 ft 8 1/2 in) standard gauge
- Electrification: 99% 15, 1% 25 kV, 16.7, 50 Hz Overhead line
- Length: 3,230 km (2,007.0 mi)

Swiss Federal Railways (German: Schweizerische Bundesbahnen, SBB; (Note: Swiss Standard German pronunciation: [ˈʃvaɪtsərɪʃɛ ˈbʊndəsˌbaːnən] and [ɛsbeːˈbeː].) French: Chemins de fer fédéraux suisses, CFF; (Note: French pronunciation: [ʃəmɛ̃ də fɛʁ fedeʁo sɥis] and [seɛfɛf].) Italian: Ferrovie federali svizzere, FFS) (Note: Italian pronunciation: [ferroˈviːe fedeˈraːli ˈzvittsere] and [ˈɛffe ˈɛffe ˈɛsse].) is the national railway company of Switzerland.

The company was founded in 1902 and is headquartered in Bern. It used to be a government institution, but since 1999 it has been a special stock corporation whose shares are held by the Swiss Confederation and the Swiss cantons. It is the largest rail and transport company of Switzerland; it operates on most standard gauge lines of the Swiss railway network. It also heavily collaborates with most other transport companies of the country, such as the BLS, one of its main competitors, or Südostbahn (SOB), to provide fully integrated timetables with cyclic schedules.

SBB was ranked first among national European rail systems in the 2017 European Railway Performance Index for its intensity of use, quality of service, and safety rating. While many rail operators in continental Europe have emphasised the building of high-speed rail, SBB has invested in the reliability and quality of service of its conventional rail network, on both national and regional scales. In addition to passenger rail, SBB operates cargo and freight rail service through its subsidiary SBB Cargo, and has large real estate holdings in Switzerland.

== Name ==
The company is commonly referred to by the initials of its three official names, in German, French and Italian – defined by federal law SR/RS 742.31 (SBBG/LCFF/LFFS) Art. 2 §1 – either as SBB CFF FFS, or used separately. The official English abbreviation is SBB. (Note: Although the abbreviation "SFR" is also registered in the commercial register of the canton of Bern, it is never used.)

While the official Romansh name, Viafiers federalas svizras (VFS), can be found in federal laws and associated documents, as well as Romansh-language media, it is not used by the company itself.

== Organisation ==
Swiss Federal Railways is divided into three divisions and eight groups. The divisions manage the relevant operational businesses. These divisions are:

- Passenger traffic
- Infrastructure
- Real estate

The former division Cargo became an independent group company at the beginning of 2019.

SBB's eight groups manage the company and support the operational business of the divisions with service and support functions. These groups are:

- Finance
- HR
- IT
- Communications
- Corporate Development
- Safety & Quality
- Legal and Compliance
- Supply Chain Management

The corporation is led in an entrepreneurial manner. A performance agreement between Swiss Federal Railways and the Swiss Confederation defines the requirements and is updated every four years. At the same time the compensation rates per train and track-kilometre are defined.

A German subsidiary, SBB GmbH, is responsible for passenger traffic in Germany. It operates the Wiesentalbahn, the Seehas services and services of Schaffhausen S-Bahn. Other subsidiaries are Thurbo, RegionAlps, AlpTransit Gotthard AG, Cisalpino, and TiLo (the latter in conjunction with Italian authorities). Swiss Federal Railways hold significant shares of the Zentralbahn (ZB) and Lyria SAS.

The Stiftung Historisches Erbe der SBB (SBB Historic) was founded in 2002. This foundation takes care of historic rolling stock and runs a technical library in Bern, document and photographic archives, and the SBB poster collection.

== Figures ==
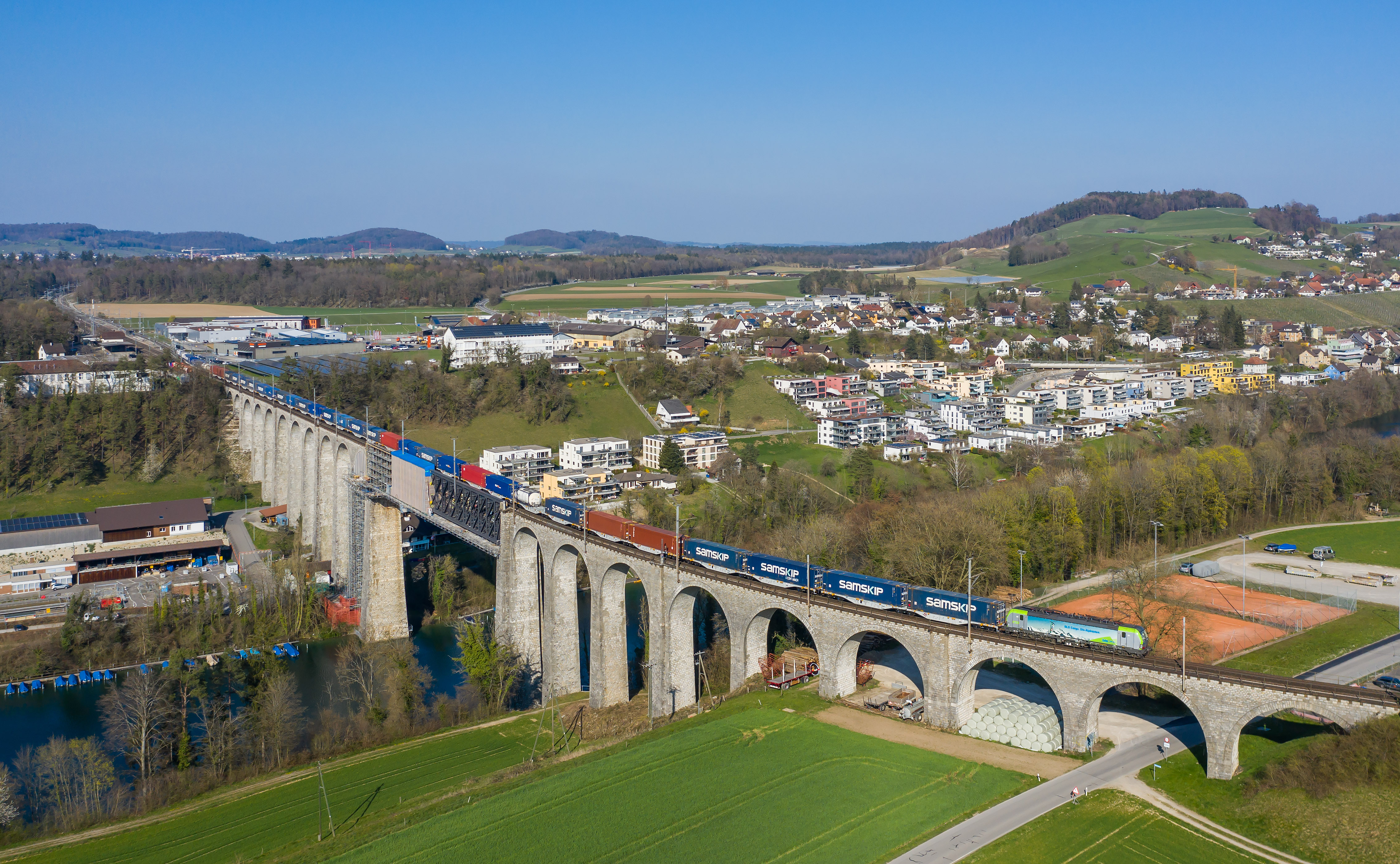
Freight train on the Eglisau bridge

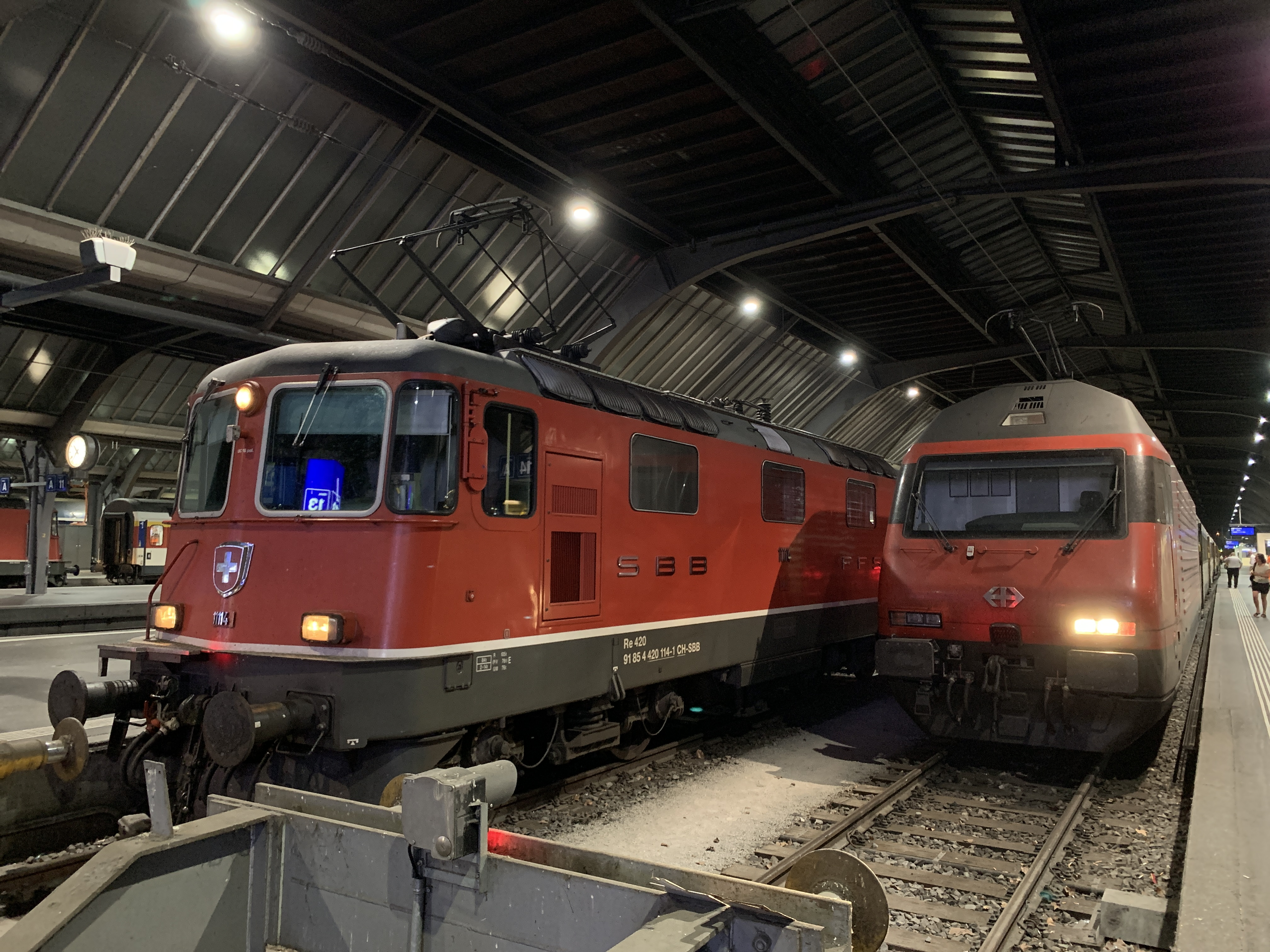
Re 420 (Re 4/4^{II}), the largest series of locomotives of SBB, and Re 460, the last Swiss-produced mainline locomotive

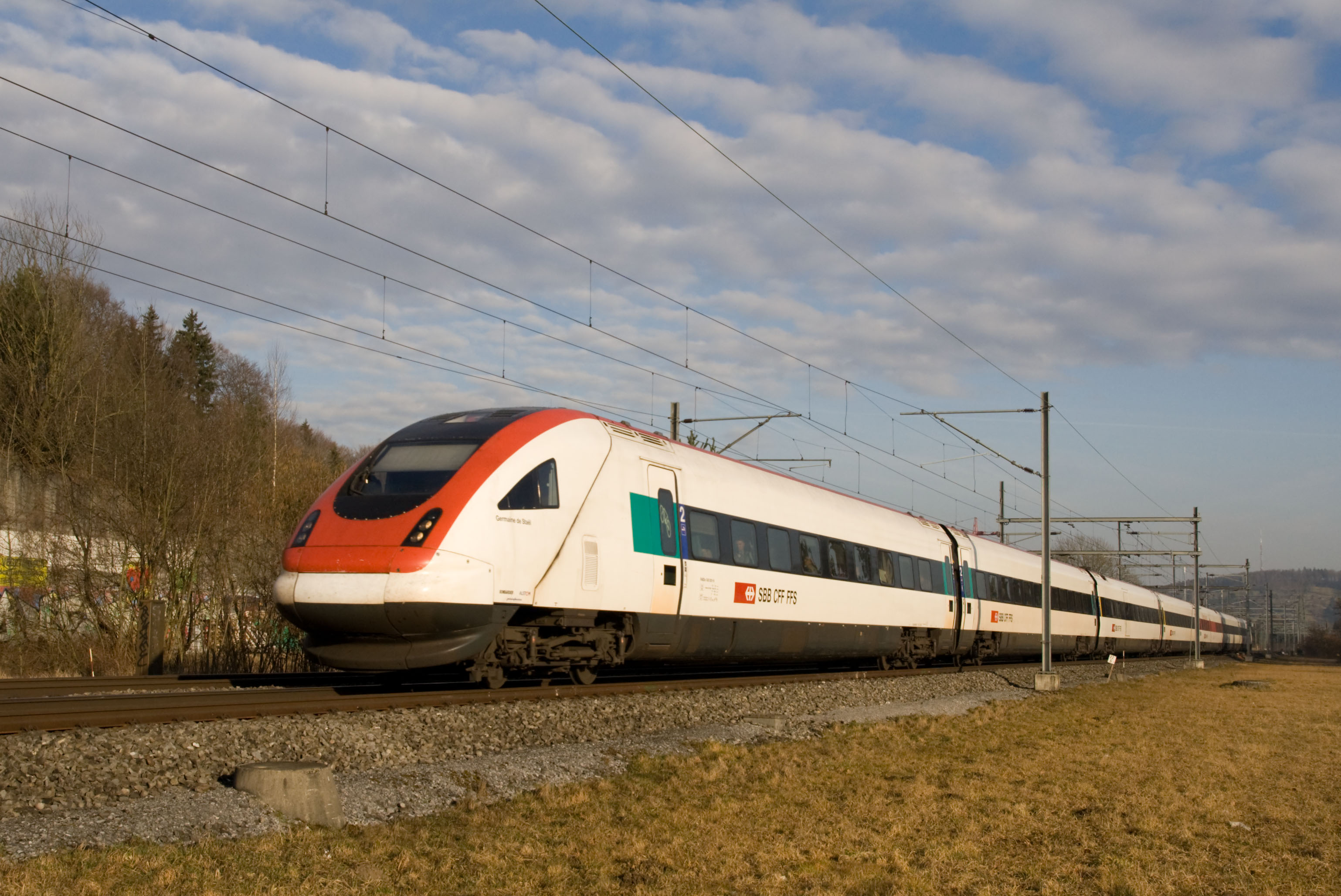
SBB RABDe 500 (ICN) between Zurich and Winterthur

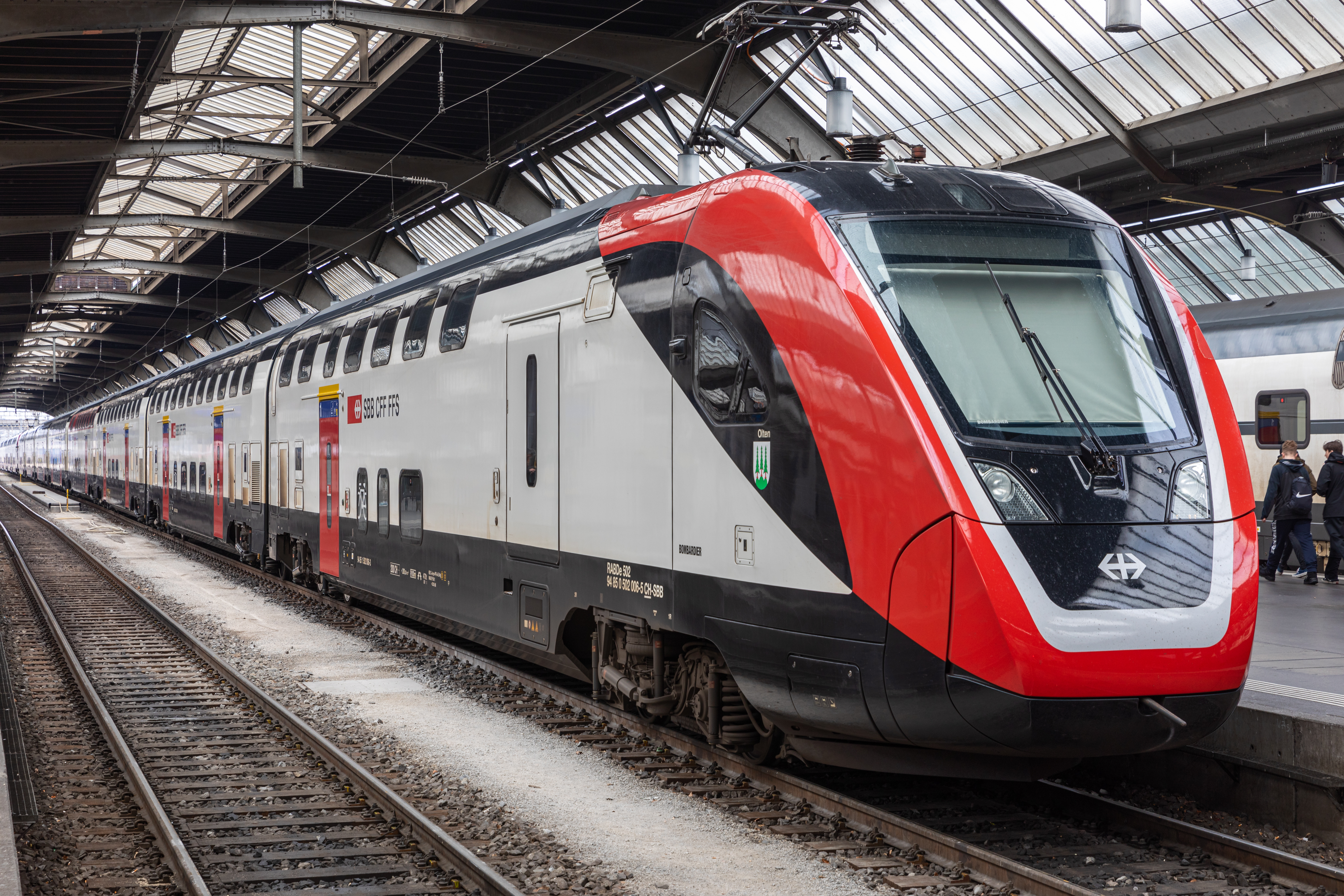
RABDe 502 (Twindexx) at Zürich HB

All figures from 2024:

Length of railway network	3,266 kilometres (2,029 mi) in standard gauge
Percentage electrified routes	100%
Employees	35,569
Passengers carried per day	1.39 million
Passenger-kilometre per inhabitant and year	1,899 kilometres (1,180 mi)
Stations open to passengers	801
Customer punctuality	93.2% of all passengers reached their destination – measured from departure station including any necessary changes – with less than three minutes of delay (either two or one minute delay, or on time)
Customer-weighted connection punctuality	98.9%
Freight per year	43,1 million tons
Stations with freight traffic	193
Railway tunnels	311
Railway tunnels total length	431.0 kilometres (267.8 mi)
Longest tunnel	57.1 kilometres (35.5 mi) (Gotthard Base Tunnel) world record
Railway bridges	4,925
Railway bridges total length	108.7 kilometres (67.5 mi)
Electric multiple units (fixed compositions of power cars and coaches)	656
Power cars	108
Mainline locomotives	543 (passenger services: 322 / freight services: 221)
Shunting locomotives	224 (38/75/ infrastructure: 111)
Shunting tractors	245 (18/24/203)
Passenger coaches	1,982
Freight wagons	4,671
Hydroelectric plants	8
Electricity produced and procured	3063 GWh
Electricity used for railway operations	2,275 GWh
Proportion of traction current from renewable sources	100%

The Swiss Federal Railways rail network is totally electrified. Its last non-electrified railway line (Etzwilen–Singen) was closed to regular traffic in 2004 and it is now a heritage railway.

The metre gauge Brünigbahn was SBB's only non-standard gauge line, until it was out-sourced and merged with the Luzern-Stans-Engelberg-Bahn to form the Zentralbahn, in which SBB holds shares.

== History ==
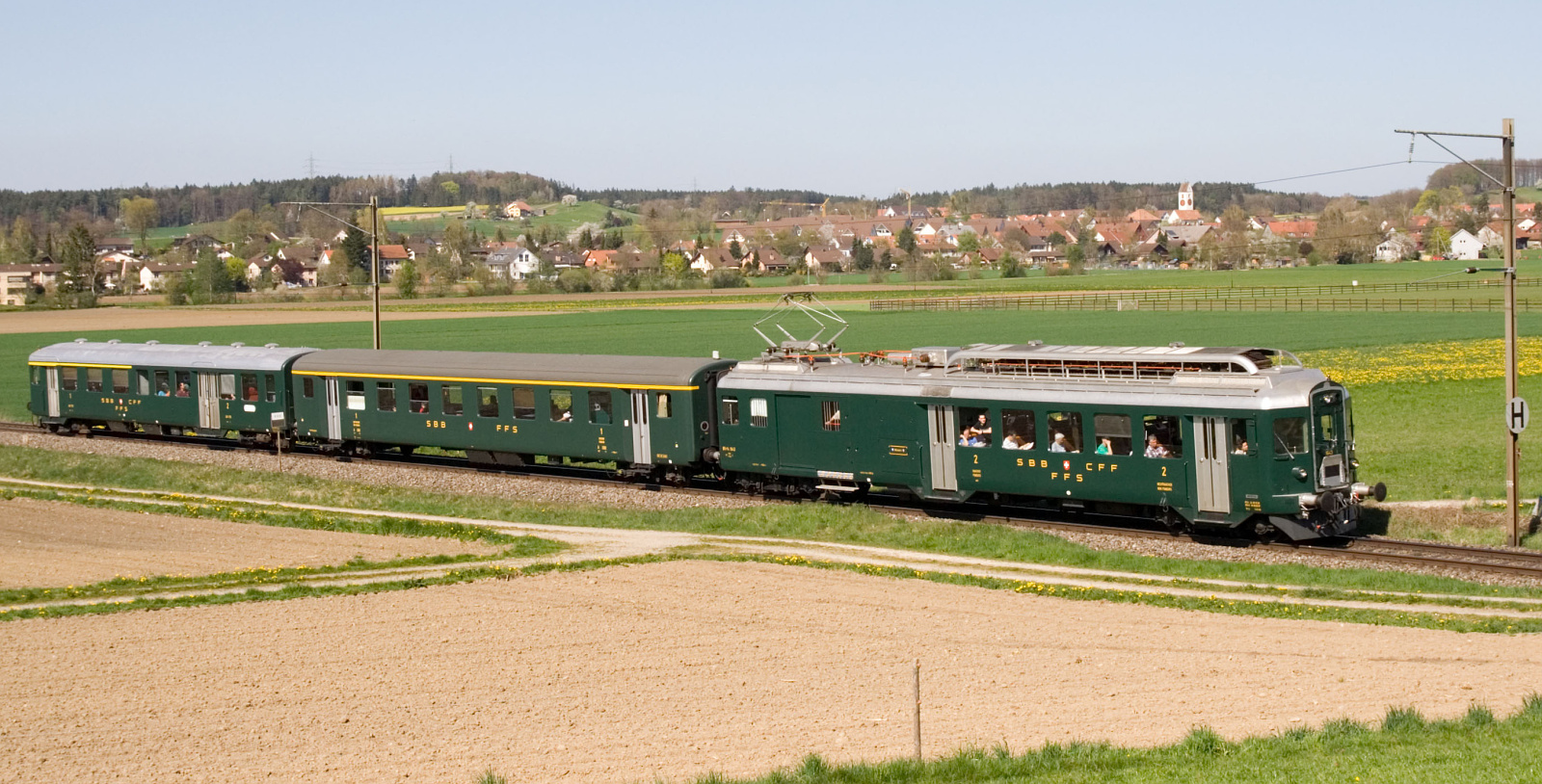
Historic SBB push-pull train consisting of BDe 4/4, A, ABt near Hettlingen ZH

In the 19th century, all Swiss railways were owned by private ventures. The economic and political interests of these companies led to lines being built in parallel and some companies went bankrupt in the resulting competition. On 20 February 1898, the Swiss people agreed in a referendum to the creation of a state-owned railway company.

Later that year, the Federal Assembly approved the purchase of Schweizerische Centralbahn (SCB) to operate trains on behalf of the federal government. The first train running on the account of the Swiss Confederation ran during the night of New Year's Eve 1900/New Year's Day 1901 from Zurich via Bern to Geneva, and received a ceremonial welcome upon arriving in Bern. SBB's management board was first formed in mid-1901, and added the Schweizerische Nordostbahn (NOB) to the system on 1 January 1902. This date is now observed as the "official" birthday of SBB.

The following railway companies were nationalised:

- Aargauische Südbahn (ASB)
- Bötzbergbahn (BöB)
- Schweizerische Nordostbahn (NOB)
- Schweizerische Centralbahn (SCB)
- Toggenburgerbahn (TB)
- Vereinigte Schweizerbahnen (VSB)
- Tösstalbahn including the Wald-Rüti Railway (WR)
- Wohlen-Bremgarten Railway (WB)
- Jura-Simplon-Bahn (JS) including the Brünigbahn (the latter in 1903)

Other companies were included later, and the rail network was extended. It is still growing today.

The Gotthard Railway was added in 1909, the Jura-Neuchâtelois in 1913, the Tösstal Railway in 1918, the Seetal Railway in 1922 and the Uerikon–Bauma Railway in 1948. The Brünig railway came with the Jura–Simplon Railway, and the Lake Constance fleet with the Swiss Northeastern Railway.

The new SBB had a great deal of renovation to do. Accounting was centralized from the start and technical standards were unified. The old administrations of the former private railways were placed, through district railway councils, under the general directorate, the board of directors and thus the federal authorities. Except for the lines of the Gotthard Railway and part of the Jura–Simplon network, the installations were in poor condition. The purchase prices exceeded the estimate by 20%, although the estimated real value of the installations was 10% below it. More powerful locomotives with higher axle loads required extensive work on the infrastructure, and the renovation of large stations and the doubling of lines were costly. As a new line, the SBB completed in 1906 the Simplon line begun by the Jura–Simplon Railway, with the Simplon Tunnel, then the longest tunnel in the world (second bore 1922). The SBB began to replace their rolling stock, made up of many small series, with standard classes.

In the interwar period, the railway administration was centralized and the network electrified. The administrative apparatus, soon mocked as Direktorenhypertrophie (an excess of directors), was slimmed down: the number of board members was cut by three quarters and the number of general directors halved. The former Central Railway administration in Basel was attached to the Lucerne district directorate in 1923, and the St. Gallen district to the Zurich district directorate. Before the First World War, the electrical companies Maschinenfabrik Oerlikon (MFO) and Brown, Boveri & Cie (BBC) had each converted an SBB line to electric operation at their own risk. For the further electrification of the network, the SBB at first adopted the three-phase technology of the Simplon line rather than the more promising single-phase alternating current technology developed by MFO, which was preferred only under the impact of the coal shortage during the First World War. Despite the unstable economy of the interwar years and growing debt, electrification was pushed ahead: the SBB built their own power plants (Piotta, Amsteg, Barberine), commissioned new types of locomotives and sped up the construction of overhead lines. Around the middle of the century, 99.5% of the SBB network was electrified, a degree of electrification unique in the world.

The federal act on the SBB of 1944 allowed a one-time debt relief, the creation of endowment capital and restructuring measures, which led to good operating results until the end of the 1960s. Despite large investments in junction and marshaling yards and in the modernization of lines and rolling stock, the railways' share of traffic fell rapidly compared with road traffic, which received two to five times the public funds provided for the railways. From 1987, additional subsidies for reduced fares, the clock-face timetable, the Rail 2000 project and the S-Bahn networks allowed the railways to win back shares of passenger traffic. In the same period, local freight services were drastically reduced. More emphasis was placed on combined rail–road freight transport, for example with the parcel company Cargo Domizil from 1985 (sold in 1996), and on the expansion of the transit routes, with the New Rail Link through the Alps (NRLA) from 1992 and planned cooperation in transport with the Italian State Railways. The revised Railway Act of 1996 released the Confederation and the SBB from obligations in regional transport. In sparsely populated areas for which no cantonal or municipal funds could be made available, this led to cuts after a decade of expanding services.

First class compartments were discontinued on 3 June 1956, and second and third class accommodation was reclassified as first and second class, respectively.

On 1 January 1999 the Swiss Federal Railway has been excluded from the Federal Administration and became a fully state-owned (the federal state owns 100% of all shares) limited company regulated by public law (German: Spezialgesetzliche Aktiengesellschaft).

In 1982, SBB introduced the Taktfahrplan (clock-face schedule), with trains for certain destinations leaving every 60 minutes, greatly simplifying the timetable.

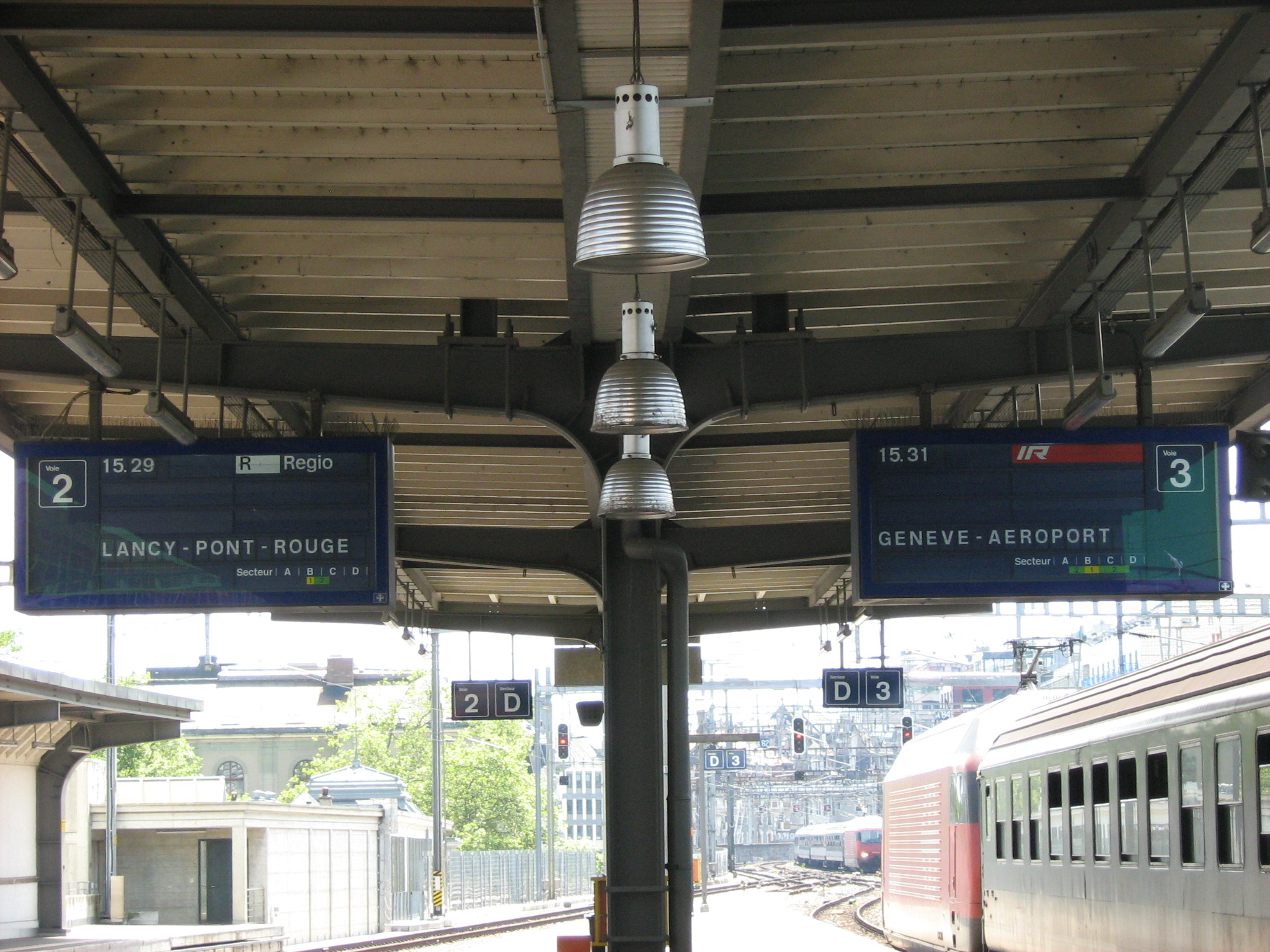
Example of integrated timetables between inter-regional and regional services on the Swiss network. The two trains are programmed to meet in the hub of Geneva at 15:30, sharing a platform, to minimise transfer times.

On 12 December 2004 the first phase of Bahn2000, an ambitious programme to improve the company's services, was put into effect. The core element was the Zurich HB–Bern–Basel SBB triangle, where travel times between the cities was reduced to under one hour, resulting in good connections from these stations for most trains. Some connections between cities got two trains in each direction per hour or more, and the S-Bahn services were intensified to four or more trains per hour. Because of these changes, 90% of the timetable was changed, 12% more trains were scheduled and travel times generally improved. It was the greatest timetable change since the introduction of the Taktfahrplan.

For this change to be possible, large parts of the infrastructure had to be modified and many stations were rebuilt, for instance the line from Ziegelbrücke to Sargans or Bern main station, which got the "wave of Bern", a bridge over the tracks to provide better access to the platforms and the city centre.

On 22 June 2005, a short circuit on a long-distance power transmission line in central Switzerland led to a chain reaction. The entire Swiss railway network was out of service during rush hour and an estimated 200,000 people and 1,500 trains were stuck at stations or somewhere on the track. It turned out that the SBB power transmission network was overloaded and did not provide enough redundancy to tolerate the shutdown of the four cable Amsteg-Steinen power line due to construction work. So, the power grid was split in two parts, the northern half being overloaded and the southern half having a load reduction for the SBB power plants are situated in the southern part (the Alps), while most of the power is needed in the northern part (the Swiss Plateau). The situation led to high-voltage fluctuations and finally breakdown and emergency shutdown of the entire power supply.

In the same year, the Swiss Federal Railways received the Wakker Prize, an award given out by the Swiss Heimatschutz (an institution aiming to preserve significant buildings), which is usually only granted to communes, for their extraordinary efforts. The Swiss Federal Railways have many listed buildings from well-known architects such as Herzog & de Meuron, Santiago Calatrava, and Max Vogt.

In May 2010, SBB's first integrated network control centre opened in Lausanne, to supervise all of SBB's network in the French-speaking part of Switzerland. Another integrated control centre will be opened in Zurich.

All trains and most buildings have been made non-smoking since the timetable change of 11 December 2005.

By the end of 2006, the corporation was handed over from the long-term CEO Benedikt Weibel to his successor Andreas Meyer.

On 13 January 2019, Bloomberg reported that SBB was in talks with German aviation company Lilium GmbH to create air taxis to carry customers from train stations to their final destination.

== Clock ==
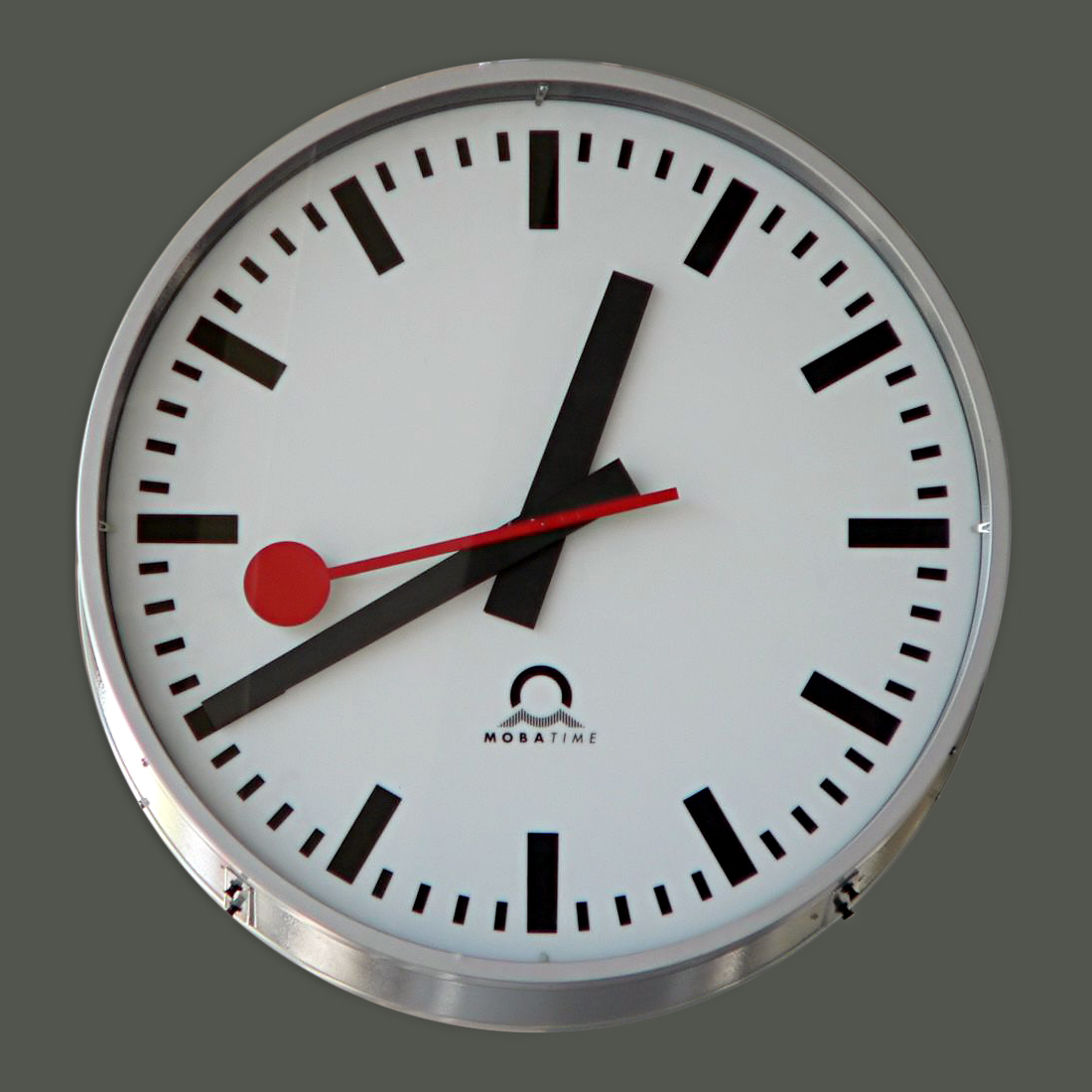
Swiss railway clock

The Swiss Federal Railways clock designed by Hans Hilfiker has become popular among the stations of Switzerland. It stops for just over a second at the end of each minute, to wait for a signal from the master clock which sets it going again — thus keeping all station clocks synchronized.

The clock owes its technology to the particular requirements of operating a railway. First, railway timetables do not list seconds; trains in Switzerland always leave the station on the full minute. Secondly, all the clocks at a railway station have to run synchronously in order to show reliable time for both passengers and railway personnel anywhere on or around the station.

The station clocks in Switzerland are synchronized by receiving an electrical impulse from a central master clock at each full minute, advancing the minute hand by one minute. The second hand is driven by an electrical motor independent of the master clock. It requires only about 58.5 seconds to circle the face, then the hand pauses briefly at the top of the clock. It starts a new rotation as soon as it receives the next minute impulse from the master clock. This movement is emulated in some of the licensed timepieces made by Mondaine.

== Rolling stock ==
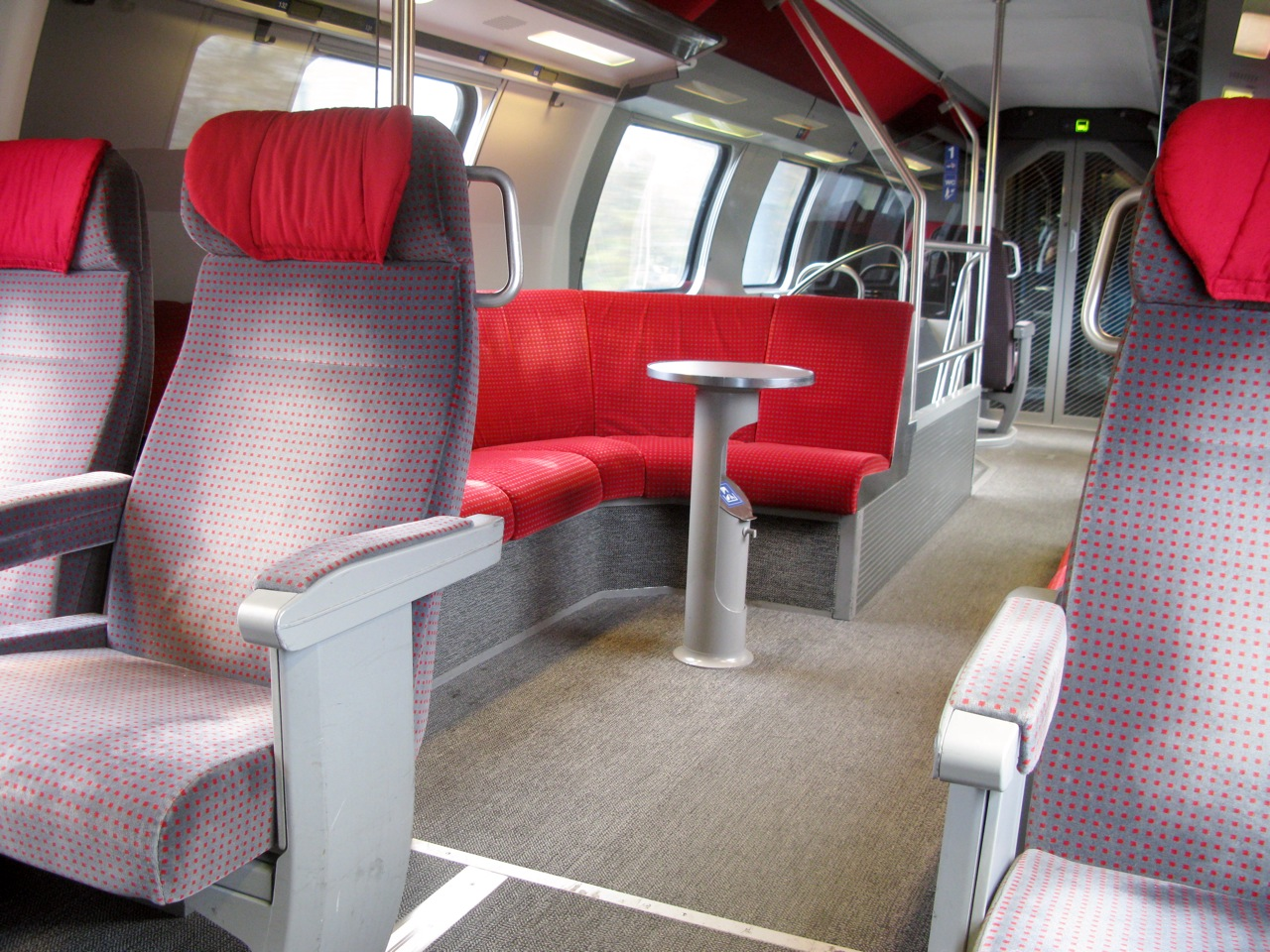
The inside of an IC 2000 train

=== Mainline locomotives ===
Steam engines of the early days of the Swiss Federal Railways were, among others, the Ed 2x2/2, E 3/3, A 3/5, B 3/4 and C 5/6.

The first electric trial runs using single-phase alternating current were made in 1903 on the line Seebach – Wettingen together with the Maschinenfabrik Oerlikon (MFO), using the future Ce 4/4 locomotives ("Eva" and "Marianne"). The electrification of the network started 1919, motivated by the coal shortages during the First World War, and new electric locomotives were introduced: Ce 6/8 ^{II}/Ce 6/8 ^{III} "Crocodile" (1920–1926), Be 4/6 (1920), Be 4/7 (1921), Ae 3/6 ^{I} (1921), Ae 3/6 ^{II} (1924), Ae 3/6 ^{III} (1925), Ae 4/7 (1927) and Ae 4/6 (1941). A shift of paradigms happened in 1946, when the age of modern bogie-based locomotives without trailing axles started with the Re 4/4 ^{I} (1946), followed by the Ae 6/6 (1952), Re 4/4 ^{II}/Re 4/4 ^{III} (1964–1971), Re 6/6 (1972), Re 450 (1989) and Re 460/Re 465 "Lok 2000" (1992–1994).

The delivery of the last Re 465 marked the end of the Swiss locomotive industries with the closure of the Swiss Locomotive and Machine Works. The Swiss Federal Railways were split into three divisions: passenger, freight and infrastructure, each with independent locomotive supply policies. Because the passenger division got all modern Re 460s and opted for multiple unit trains, mainline locomotives were bought only by the cargo division, namely Re 482 "Traxx F140 AC" (2002), Re 484 "Traxx F140 MS" (2004) and Re 474 "ES64 F4" (2004).

=== Multiple units ===
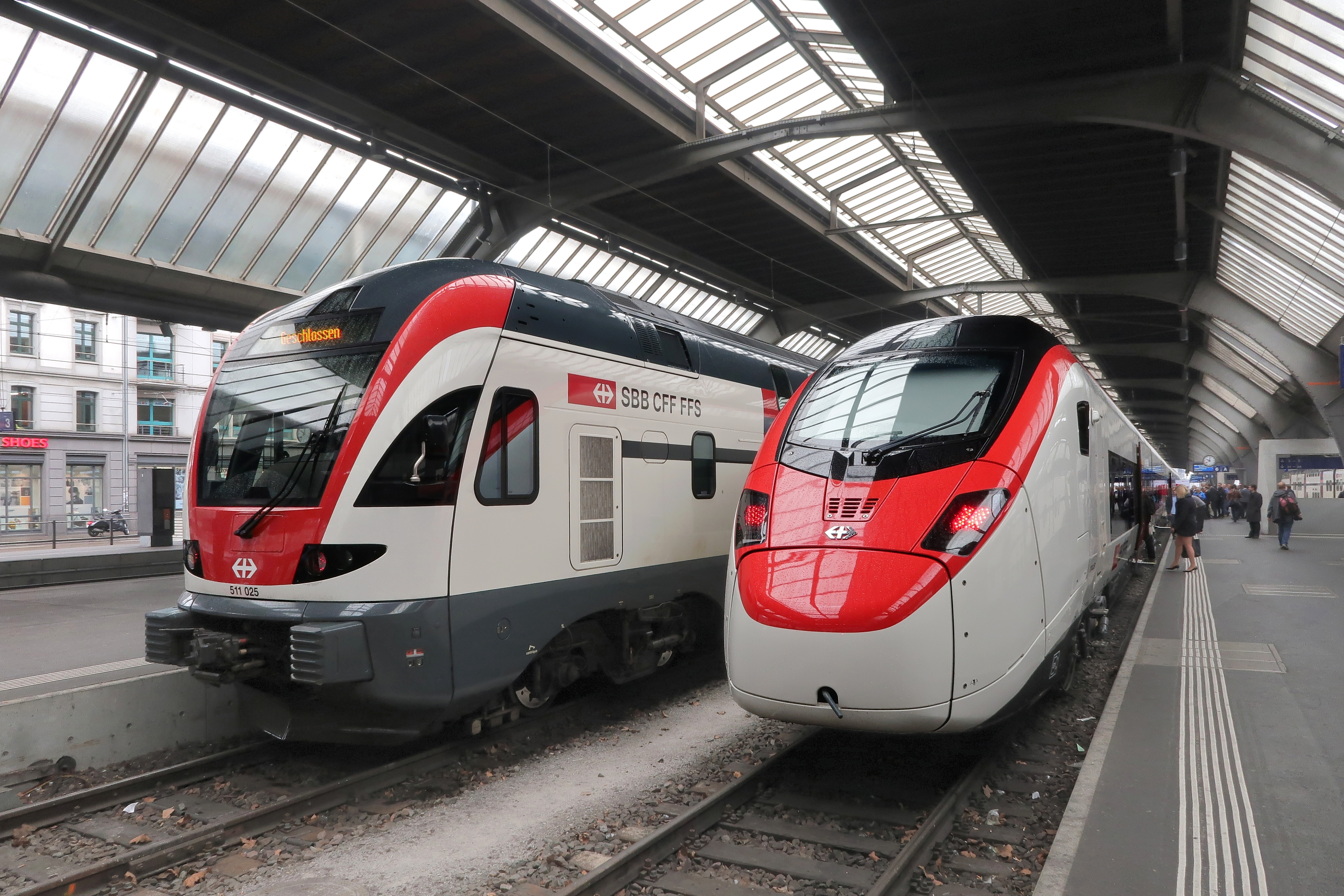
Stadler KISS (SBB RABe 511) and SMILE (SBB RABe 501) trains at Zürich HB

The first multiple units originated from the Seetalbahn, which was formed in 1922. Larger series were uncommon until after 1950: Be 4/6 (1923), De 4/4 (1927), BDe 4/4 (1952), RBe 4/4 (1959), RBDe 560 "NPZ" (1984) and RABe 520 "GTW" (2002).

The first multiple unit trainsets were bought for the introduction of the Taktfahrplan on the Zurich–Meilen–Rapperswil line in 1967: RABDe 12/12 "Mirage" (1965) and RABDe 8/16 "Chiquita" (1976). Multiple unit trainsets started to prevail in the 1990s, especially for commuter traffic: RABDe 500 "ICN" (1999), RABe 523 (et al.) "FLIRT" (2004), RABe 514 "DTZ" (2006), and RABe 503 (2008). While locomotive-hauled trains are rarely seen in commuter traffic nowadays, they are still the usual in long-distance traffic. In 2011, Stadler's RABe 511 were introduced in Zurich's S-Bahn and in 2012 was introduced as a RegioExpress (RE) between Geneva and Romont, between Geneva and Vevey, and between Bern and Biel/Bienne.

Some of the most popular historic multiple unit trainsets are the Roten Pfeile (lit. 'Red Arrows', RAe 2/4) and the "Churchill-Pfeil" (RAe 4/8). In international traffic, the Trans-Europ-Express (TEE) diesel trainsets appeared in 1957, but were replaced by four-systems electric trainsets RAe TEE^{II} in 1961.

On 12 May 2010, the Swiss Federal Railways announced its largest order of rolling stock; buying 59 double-deck EMUs (Twindexx/RABe 502) from Bombardier Inc., plus an option for another 100 trainsets. The new trains were originally intended to be delivered starting in 2012, but due to several delays, deliveries began in 2017 and ended in 2020.

In addition, SBB has received and, as of 2016, is still in the process of delivering, New Pendolino (RABe 503) multiple units and has ordered 29 SMILEs (RABe 501), with an option for 92 more, expected to enter service in 2019.

== Languages ==
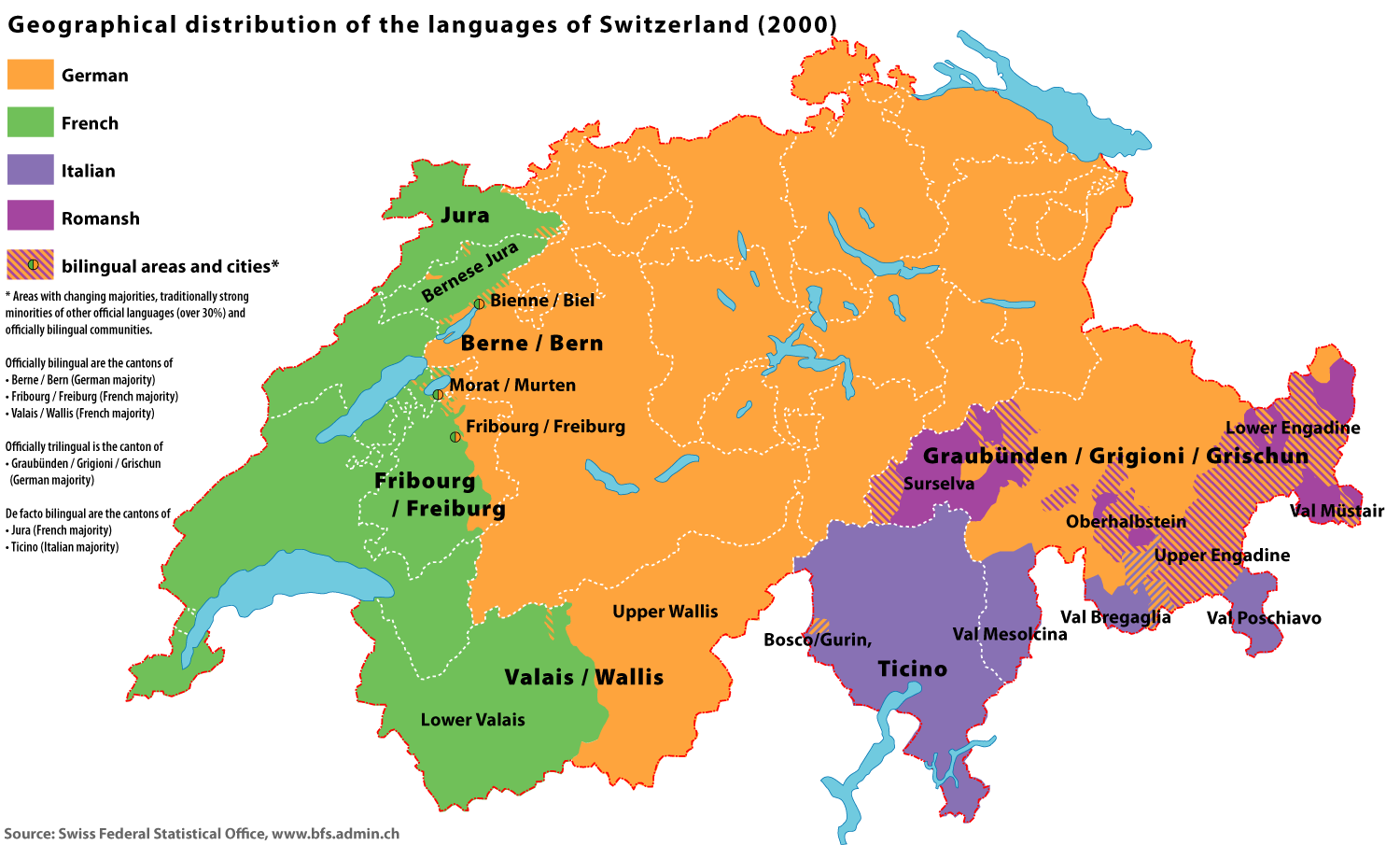
Distribution of Languages in Switzerland

SBB uses three official languages: German, French, and Italian. The Romansh-speaking regions in the Swiss canton of Grisons (Graubünden) is served mostly by the Rhaetian Railway (RhB). Locomotives and railcars are branded "SBB CFF FFS".

Stations are named and signposted exclusively in the language of the locality. Stations of bilingual cities are named and signposted in both local languages (e.g. Biel/Bienne and Fribourg/Freiburg). The timetable only uses such official names regardless of the languages of the timetable.

Announcements in stations are usually made in local languages. However, in stations frequently used by foreigners (airports or tourism regions), in-station announcements are also made in English. On-board welcome announcements are made in all official languages of the regions served by that train, with the additional English ones onboard IC trains. Then the stops are announced in the pre-recorded local language of the town. For stations of bilingual cities, the language of announcement changes at the time of stop: when trains travelling from the French-speaking region to the German-speaking region via the bilingual city of Biel/Bienne, announcements are made in French until arriving at Bienne, and then switch to German after departing from Biel. Upon arriving at big hubs, the train conductor takes the microphone to announce in all official languages of the regions served by that train (plus English onboard IC trains) that the train is arriving, if the train is on time or not, and next connections at the station.

For instance, the main station in the German-speaking Zurich is signposted as Zürich HB (short for Zürich Hauptbahnhof) exclusively in German, while its French name Zurich gare centrale, Italian name Zurigo stazione centrale, and English name (Zurich Main Station) are used in websites and announcements in respective languages.

Audio file of the SBB-CFF-FFS melody

Since 2002, SBB has used music in train announcements. The notes in the music correspond to the acronyms SBB CFF FFS, transposed by means of the German notes "Es - B - B" (E♭, B♭, B♭), "C - F - F" (C, F, F) and "F - F - Es" (F, F, E♭). For the German acronym, as there is no "S" note, the "Es" was used. And for the last letter, it is the B♭/G♭ chord that is played. The melody is played on a vibraphone. The melody played depends on which canton (or country onboard international services) the station or train is located in, and manual announcements play the three-language melody in the file above.

== Services ==
=== Train services ===
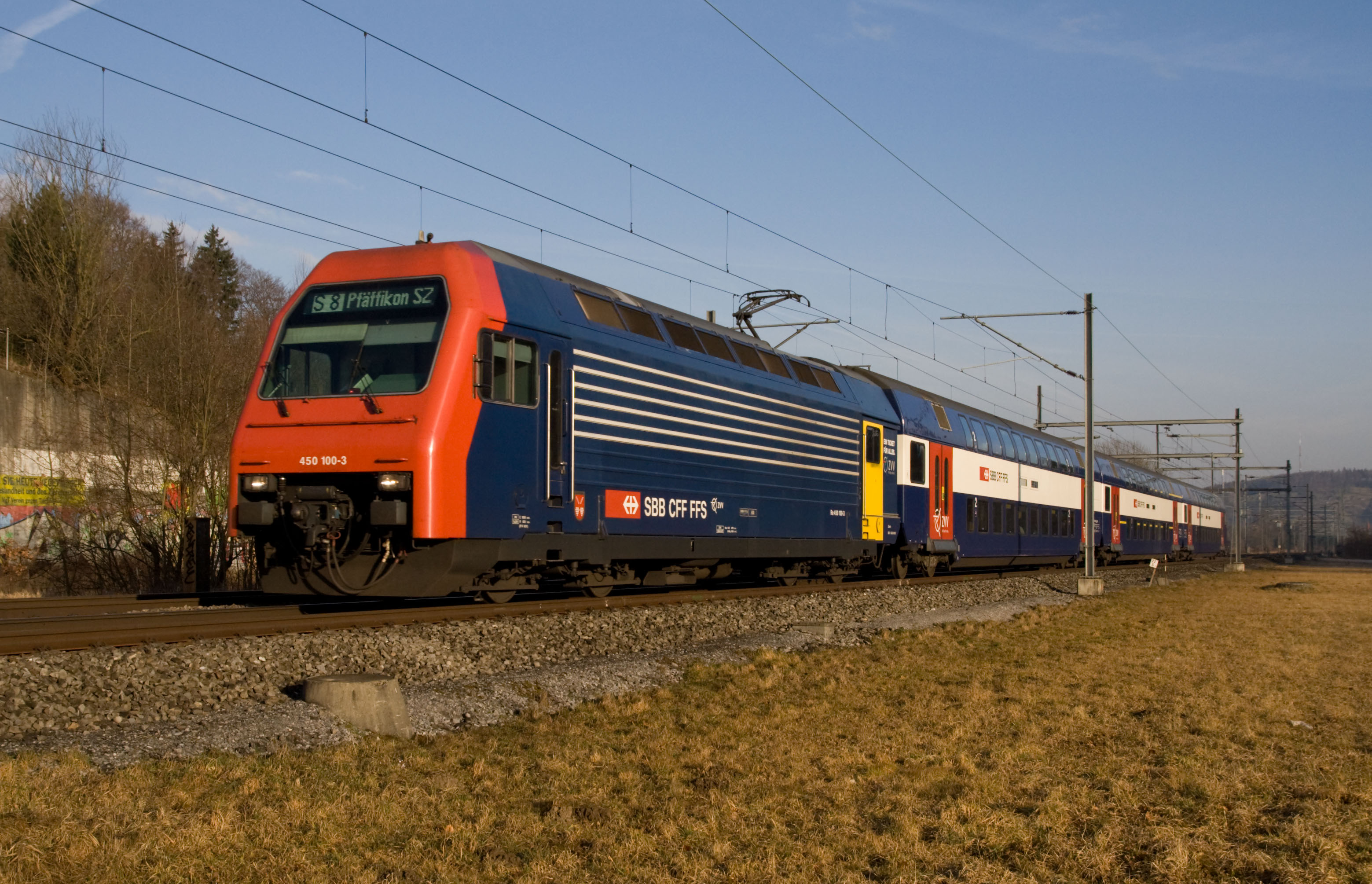
Re 450-hauled trainset operating for Zurich S-Bahn

SBB-CFF-FFS train arriving at Bern

SBB has the following services:

- R#: Regio (Regionalzug), typically numbered, stops at all stations
- S#: S-Bahn (commuter train), typically numbered, organized as a rapid transit system in major agglomerations, with several lines and generally high frequent service (see S-Bahn networks in Switzerland).
  - S-Bahn services in the French speaking part of Switzerland are often designated with R# for Réseau Express Régional (e.g. RER Vaud) or L# (Léman Express).
- RE#: RegioExpress, since the 2023 timetable change numbered, stops only at selected stations within a region.
- IR#: InterRegio, since the 2017 timetable change numbered, are the workhorses of Swiss transit.
- IC#: InterCity, since the 2017 timetable change numbered, stops only at major cities.
  - ICN: InterCity Tilting Train (InterCity-Neigezug), similar to the IC, but using tilting trains instead of standard/double-decked trains. The ICN designation was discontinued as of 10 December 2017, with former ICN services now being branded as IC, but still run by tilting trains.
- PE: Panorama Express, introduced in 2019, are tourist oriented long-distance services (e.g. the Gotthard Panorama Express).
- EXT: Charter train or special train added when an exceptionally heavy traffic is expected.

Several services are currently operated by other railway companies, including subsidiaries of Swiss Federal Railways (e.g. Thurbo). Some services are also jointly operated with other companies (e.g. Treno Gottardo).

SBB CFF FFS also operates international EuroCity (EC) and EuroNight (EN) trains while within Switzerland, while Deutsche Bahn operates Intercity Express (ICE) services to, from, and (a few services) within the country serving Swiss cities such as Interlaken, Bern, Basel, Zurich, and Chur. Under the name TGV Lyria the French railway company SNCF operates TGV connections to Switzerland. Lyria SAS, a company established under French law, is a subsidiary of the French National Railway Company, SNCF, which owns 74%, and the Swiss Federal Railways, which owns 26%. TGV Lyria serves several Swiss cities including Geneva, Lausanne, Basel, Zurich, Bern, and Interlaken. It also provides services to certain locations including Brig (Valais), especially during the winter season, to provide a connection for tourists mainly visiting the south-eastern Swiss Alps. These connections are marketed under the name of TGV Lyria des Neiges.

=== Lines ===
Since 2018, the SBB uses numbers and distinct colors for all its InterCity (IC) and InterRegio (IR) lines (like a subway network) to ease connections. The IC, IR and RE (RegioExpress) lines (including alternative routes) are as follows:

==== InterCity ====
InterCity (IC) are mainline trains in Switzerland connecting the country's major agglomerations, the range of services (in Switzerland) of which is located between InterRegio (IR, inter-regional) and EuroCity (EC).

==== InterRegio ====
InterRegio (IR) is a European train category, with Switzerland possessing the most dense network. IR trains are semi-fast long-distance trains with more stops and usually lower prices than more upscale long-distance trains such as the InterCity.

Lines IR26 (since 2020), IR35 (since 2021), and IR46 (since 2020) are jointly operated with Südostbahn (SOB). Lines IR17 and IR65 are operated by BLS since December 2020 and December 2019, respectively.

=== Customer services ===
SBB offers additional services for customers. SBB Digital promotes new digital services for customers. For example, SBB started a collaboration with the recruiting matchmaking service, Jacando, and their own co-working space in Zurich. SBB has won CRM awards in Switzerland for their SBB Digital activities.

== Airline codeshare ==
- SBB codeshares with American Airlines, Swiss International Air Lines, and United Airlines out of Zurich Airport.

== See also ==
- List of stock used by Swiss Federal Railways
- PostBus Switzerland
- Rail transport in Switzerland
- Public transport in Switzerland
- Gotthardbahn
- Gotthard Base Tunnel
- Lötschberg Base Tunnel
- Rail 2000
- NRLA

== Notes and references ==
=== References ===
This article incorporates text from a free content work. Licensed under CC-BY SA. Text taken from Schweizerische Bundesbahnen (SBB), Hans-Peter Bärtschi, Historical Dictionary of Switzerland.
