= Ludwig Munzinger Jr. =

German publisher (1921–2012)

- Born: Ludwig Werner Munzinger Jr. 24 February 1921; Weingarten, Germany
- Died: 7 April 2012 (aged 91); Ravensburg, Germany
- Father: Ludwig Munzinger

Ludwig Munzinger Jr. (24 February 1921 – 7 April 2012) was a German publisher of Munzinger-Archiv who took over his father's business in 1957. Munzinger Jr. died on 7 April 2012.
