= 1898 Swiss referendums =

Three referendums were held in Switzerland during 1898. The first was held on 20 February on a federal law that would nationalise the railways, and was approved by a majority of voters, leading to the establishment of Swiss Federal Railways in 1902. The second and third referendums were held on 13 November on revising article 64 and adding article 64bis to the constitution (unifying civil and criminal law across the country, respectively), both of which were approved by a majority of voters and cantons.

== Background ==
The referendums on the constitutional amendments were mandatory referendums, which required a double majority; a majority of the popular vote and majority of the cantons. The decision of each canton was based on the vote in that canton. Full cantons counted as one vote, whilst half cantons counted as half. The railways referendum was an optional referendum, which required only a majority of the public vote.

== Results ==
=== Railway nationalisation ===
Choice	Votes	%
For	386,634	67.9
Against	182,718	32.1
Blank votes	2,754	–
Invalid votes	1,459	–
Total	573,565	100
Registered voters/turnout	734,644	78.1
Source: Nohlen & Stöver

=== Amendment to article 64 of the constitution ===
Choice	Popular vote		Cantons		
Choice	Votes	%	Full	Half	Total
For	264,914	72.2	15	3	16.5
Against	101,762	27.8	4	3	5.5
Blank votes	15,922	–	–	–	–
Invalid votes	4,628	–	–	–	–
Total	387,226	100	19	6	22
Registered voters/turnout	734,075	52.8	–	–	–
Source: Nohlen & Stöver

=== Addition of article 64bis to the constitution ===
Choice	Popular vote		Cantons		
Choice	Votes	%	Full	Half	Total
For	266,610	72.4	15	3	16.5
Against	101,780	27.6	4	3	5.5
Blank votes	15,300	–	–	–	–
Invalid votes	3,903	–	–	–	–
Total	387,593	100	19	6	22
Registered voters/turnout	734,075	52.8	–	–	–
Source: Nohlen & Stöver
