= Vincent Ducrot =

Swiss public transport executive

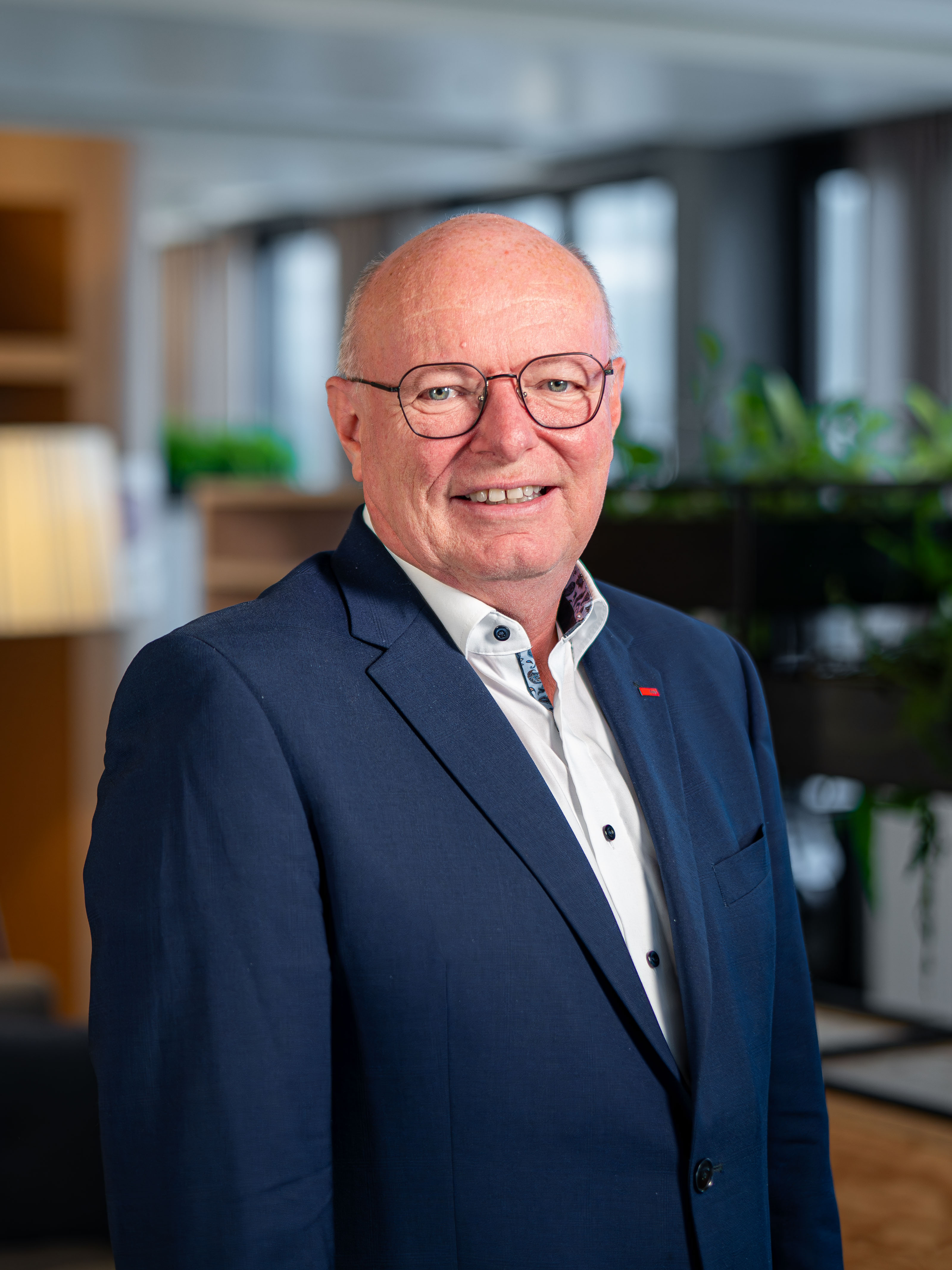
- Born: 7 September 1962 (age 63); Châtel-St-Denis, Switzerland
- Education: EPFL, ETHZ
- Occupation: CEO of SBB (1 April 2020)
- Predecessor: Andreas Meyer (manager)

Vincent Ducrot (born 7 September 1962) is a Swiss public transport executive. The electrical engineer specialised in information technology was the managing director of Transports publics Fribourgeois (TPF) from 2011 to 2020, before being named as the new CEO of Swiss Federal Railways (SBB) in December 2019. He took up the position on 1 April 2020. The engineer with expertise in project management spent most of his career (from 1993 to 2011) at SBB, before becoming its CEO in 2020.

== Biography ==
=== Early life and education ===
Vincent Ducrot was born in 1962 in Châtel-Saint-Denis in the canton of Fribourg, as the eldest of three children.

After a baccalaureate (Latin-languages) at Bulle College, he obtained a degree in Electrical Engineering (specialising in computer science) at the Swiss Federal Institute of Technology (EPFL) in Lausanne in 1987. He completed this training with a postgraduate diploma in industrial organization from the center for industrial management (BWI) of the Swiss Federal Institute of Technology (ETHZ) of Zurich, as well as a certificate in portfolio management (Certified Portfolio Director IPMA Level A) and the OWP (Orchestrating winning performance) continuing education program of the International Institute for Management Development (IMD) in Lausanne.

=== Early career ===
Vincent Ducrot began his professional life in 1986 as an IT specialist in various positions in Switzerland and abroad (Europe and the United States).

=== Swiss Federal Railways (SBB) ===
In 1993, Vincent Ducrot started his career in the railway industry as the Head of SBB's Software Product Division.

From 1997 to 2002, he was the Executive for Expo.02, responsible for organising public transport during the Swiss National Exposition (held from 15 May to 20 October 2002).

From 1999 to 2010, he was Head of Long-Distance Services of the SBB, responsible for deciding and implementing the long-distance services strategy for the Swiss rail network. During this time he worked on the introduction of the first phase of Rail 2000 and the opening of the new Lötschberg Line and of the Lötschberg Tunnel (9 December 2007).

Internationally, he was involved in setting up the TGV Lyria, the French high-speed rail connection between France and Switzerland with a first connection between Paris and Lausanne and, among others, the LGV Est, as the connection between Basel and Paris since 2007. Vincent Ducrot He also established the transport SBB's Swiss Transport Concept for UEFA Euro 2008.

From 2009 to 2010, Vincent Ducrot also held the post ad interim of Acting Head of Passenger Division, which saw him join the senior management at SBB.

=== Transport Publics Fribourgeois (TPF) ===
On 17 November 2010, Vincent Ducrot was named managing director of Transports publics Fribourgeois (TPF) with effect from 1 July 2011. He transformed the TPF into a holding company in 2015. Under his leadership, the number of passengers has risen from 25.7 million in 2011 to 32.5 million in 2018, and the number of employees has increased from 700 to nearly 1,200.

At the head of the TPFs, he carried out several infrastructure modernisation projects, including new-generation stations, notably in Bossonnens, Belfaux, Pensier, Münchenwiler-Courgevaux, Montbovon and Châtel-St-Denis. Between 2014 and 2019, five new real estate districts have also been created around stations designed as new living spaces, i.e. those of Bulle and Châtel-St-Denis.

In spring 2019, the director saw the completion of another huge project that he initiated at Givisiez: the new TPF Maintenance and Administrative Centre. Named "Givisiez Ensemble", this 70,000 m2 complex brings together the company's maintenance activities, operations centre and administration in a single location.

Its track record also includes technological innovations for TPF users, including participation in the launch of FAIRTIQ (a mobile ticketing app released by 21 Swiss transport companies) and the introduction of SMS ticketing (an application for purchasing bus tickets by SMS.)

In 2017, the TPFs also opened the first test line of Navya SAS autonomous shuttles in Marly, where electric vehicles could run without driving personnel after the test phase.

=== CEO of Swiss Federal Railways (SBB) ===
On 10 December 2019, the board of directors of Swiss Federal Railways (SBB) announced the appointment of Vincent Ducrot to the position of CEO, with effect from 1 April 2020. He replaces Andreas Meyer, who had been at the head of the country's largest public transport company since 2007 and had announced – in September 2019 – his intention to step down in 2020. The engineer from Fribourg thus becomes the first person from French-speaking Switzerland in almost 50 years to head the SBB. The new SBB director faces an initial, unforeseen and enormous challenge from the outset: the organisation and management of rail traffic, which has been greatly reduced since 19 March 2020, due to the coronavirus pandemic, and the planning for the resumption of normal rail traffic operations after the lockdown. In particular, Vincent Ducrot will have to deal with the economic challenges posed by the health crisis for the Swiss Federal Railways (SBB), which posted a loss of almost 500 million Swiss francs in the first half of 2020.

=== Opinions ===
At the head of the Transports publics fribourgeois (TPF), Vincent Ducrot has invested in the development of autonomous electric shuttles by commissioning (in 2017) the first test line of Navya SAS autonomous shuttles in Marly. He is convinced that autonomous vehicles on the road and also on the rails will play an important role in the public transport of the future.

== Publications ==
- Information Engineering in der Praxis: Konzepte und Strategien zur Software-Eigenentwicklung, Walter Brenner (éditeur), Christoph Binkert (éditeur), Michael Lehmann-Kahler (éditeur), Campus Verlag, 2019, Vincent Ducrot co-author.
