= Ludwig Munzinger =

German publisher (1877–1957)

- Born: 28 August 1877; Sarrebourg, Germany
- Died: 15 November 1957 (aged 80); Ravensburg, West Germany
- Children: Ludwig Munzinger Jr.

Ludwig Munzinger (28 August 1877 – 15 November 1957) was the founder of the German encyclopedia Munzinger-Archiv. Following his death, his son Ludwig Munzinger Jr. took over the running of the organization.

== Life ==
After attending secondary school in Strasbourg and Wissembourg, Munzinger studied law in Würzburg at the request of his family, although he had actually wanted to become an officer. In 1897, like many members of the Munzinger family, he joined a Corps, affiliating with Corps Rhenania Würzburg, as had his grandfather Ludwig Munzinger, district court president in Landau and Strasbourg, and his father Ludwig Munzinger. After the death of his father in 1897, Munzinger entered the Imperial German Army in 1898 and became a lieutenant in a Jäger battalion stationed in the Alsatian city of Colmar in 1899. After two and a half years, he left the military and began studying law in Munich and Heidelberg. In 1901, he received a doctorate in law (Dr. iur.) from Heidelberg and later also earned a doctorate in philosophy (Dr. phil.). From 1903 to 1907, Munzinger was a member of the editorial staff of the Allgemeine Zeitung in Munich, where he eventually served as deputy editor-in-chief.

On 17 March 1913, Ludwig Munzinger published the first issue of the Archiv für publizistische Arbeit in Berlin — later known as the Munzinger Archive. After his death, management of the Munzinger Archive was taken over by his son, Ludwig Munzinger Jr..

In 1930, he moved with his family to Dresden (Loschwitz), the hometown of his wife Cora. After the bombing of Dresden in February 1945 and the resulting destruction of parts of the publishing house, the Munzinger family fled to Ravensburg, where the company was rebuilt.
