= Munzinger-Archiv =

German encyclopedia

Munzinger-Archiv GmbH
- Founded: 1913; 113 years ago
- Founder: Ludwig Munzinger
- Headquarters: Ravensburg, Germany
- Key people: Ernst Munzinger (director)
- Website: www.munzinger.de

Munzinger-Archiv is a German publisher and online encyclopedia based in the Baden-Württemberg city of Ravensburg. The content of the archive includes entries about people in politics, business, culture, sport, music and society, about all countries in the world and about current events. The online service with several million entries is supplemented by other databases, works and portals from partners and is mainly used by publishing houses, the press, radio, political institutions and libraries.

== History ==
The Munzinger-Archiv was created by Ludwig Munzinger in 1913, who, as a former journalist and editorial director of the Berliner Dienst press agency, saw a market for an information service that would allow newspaper editors to quickly and reliably research background information on people and factual topics. On 17 March 1913, the first delivery of the Archiv für publizistische Arbeit (archive for journalistic work) appeared, which from then on was continued on a weekly basis.

In 1914 Munzinger was drafted for military service in World War I. The archive continued during the war, albeit on a reduced scale, led by his wife Cora. In 1918 Munzinger returned to his family, who had since moved to Ravensburg in Upper Swabia. Starting with 1923 the archive became increasingly successful, and in 1926 Munzinger moved the company headquarters back to Berlin.

1928 the program was expanded to include a sports archive. During Nazi Germany, the archive was not integrated into the NSDAP press system like many other press companies or brought into line with it, but from 1936 onwards it had to employ a censor from the Dresden propaganda directorate. After the bombing of Dresden in 1945, the Munzinger family fled again to Ravensburg, where the company is still based today.

After the death of the founder, Ludwig Munzinger Jr. took over Munzinger-Archiv in 1957. Ernst Munzinger, his son, took over the role of director from his father in 1988.

== Program ==
Loose leaf notebooks:

- Internationales Handbuch – Zeitarchiv (until 1952: Chronik der Tagesereignisse)
- Internationales Handbuch – Länder aktuell (until 1954: Statistisch-politische Blätter)
- Internationales Biographisches Archiv – Personen aktuell
- Internationales Sportarchiv
- Gedenktage
- Pop-Archiv International (since 1990, in cooperation with Saarländischen Rundfunk)

Digital publications on Munzinger Online:

- Munzinger Personen – Internationales Biographisches Archiv – Personen aktuell
- Munzinger Sport – Internationales Sportarchiv
- Munzinger Pop – Pop-Archiv International
- Munzinger Länder – Internationales Handbuch – Länder aktuell
- Munzinger Chronik – Internationales Handbuch – Zeitarchiv
- Munzinger Gedenktage Plus (since 2001, in cooperation with Südwestrundfunk)
- Kindlers literature encyclopedia (since 2011)
- KLG – Kritisches Lexikon der Gegenwartsliteratur (since 2007)
- KLfG – Kritisches Lexikon der fremdsprachigen Gegenwartsliteratur (since 2007)
- Neue Rundschau Archiv (since 2012)
- Lexikon der Illustration (since 2013)
- KDG – Komponisten der Gegenwart (since 2007)
- film-dienst – Kritiken (since 2004, with critiques from Filmdienst)
- Naxos Music Library (since 2013)
- Naxos Music Library Jazz (since 2013)
- Naxos Spoken Word Library (since 2013)
- Naxos Video Library (since 2013)
- Naxos Music Library World (since 2015)
- Duden Sprachwissen – 18 Wörterbücher und Lexika von Duden (since 2013)
- Duden Basiswissen Schule (since 2016)
- Frankfurter Allgemeine Archiv (since 2012)
- Die Welt (since 2015)
- Süddeutsche Zeitung (since 2013)
- Der Spiegel (since 2013)
- PressReader (since 2013)

Former digital publications on Munzinger Online:

- Brockhaus Enzyklopädie digital (2003 to 2015)
- Hamburger Abendblatt (2013 to 2015)
- Berliner Morgenpost (2013 to 2015)

== Literature ==
- 75 Jahre Munzinger-Archiv. 1913–1988. Munzinger-Archiv, Ravensburg 1988, ISBN 3-923070-11-X
- Ernst Munzinger: Vom Zettelkasten zum Wissensarchiv. Erfahrungen aus der Praxis eines Informationsdienstleisters beim Übergang in die Wissensgesellschaft. In: Gertraud Koch (publisher): Internationalisierung von Wissen. Multidisziplinäre Beiträge zu neuen Praxen des Wissenstransfers (= Wissen, Kultur, Kommunikation, Volume 2), Röhrig, St. Ingbert 2006, ISBN 3-86110-389-3
- Ernst Munzinger: Vom Zettelarchiv zum Internetinformationsdienst. Das Munzinger-Archiv in Ravensburg-Oberzell. In: mit Brief und Siegel … ins Internet. Archive im Landkreis Ravensburg (= Zeitzeichen, Volume 4). Kreissparkasse, Ravensburg 2007, DNB 98676230X, OCLC 219413059 p. 48–51
- Klaus-Peter Schmid: Leben fürs Archiv. Munzinger: Das Internet bedroht das Geschäft mit biografischen Daten, In: Die Zeit, 13 March 2003
