= Indian locomotive class WCP-2 =

DC Locomotive

GIPR EA/2 IR WCP-2
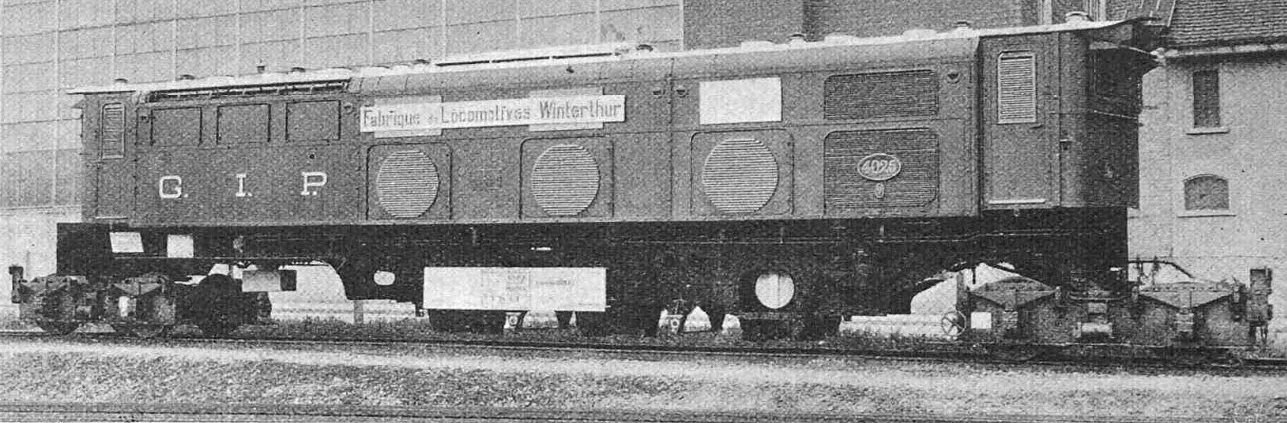
- Locomotive shell of the WCP-2 being moved on special transport bogies
Type and origin
- Power type: Electric
- Builder: SLM, Metrovick
- Build date: 1938
- Total produced: 1
Specifications
- Configuration
  - UIC: 2’Bo(A1)
- Gauge: 1,676 mm (5 ft 6 in)
- Wheel diameter: 1,600 mm (5 ft 3 in)
- Wheelbase: 11.883 m (38 ft 11 3/4 in)
- Length: 16.300 metres (53 ft 5 3/4 in) over buffers
- Adhesive weight: 60 t (59 long tons; 66 short tons)
- Loco weight: 100 t (98 long tons; 110 short tons)
- Electric system/s: 1500 volts D.C.
- Traction motors: Six
- Transmission: SLM universal drive
Performance figures
- Maximum speed: 137 km/h (85 mph)
- Power output
  - 1 hour: 1,562 kW (2,095 hp)
  - Continuous: 1,368 kW (1,835 hp)
- Tractive effort
  - Starting: 150 kN (34,000 lbf)
Career
- Numbers: GIPR 4025; IR 20024
- Withdrawn: 1980s

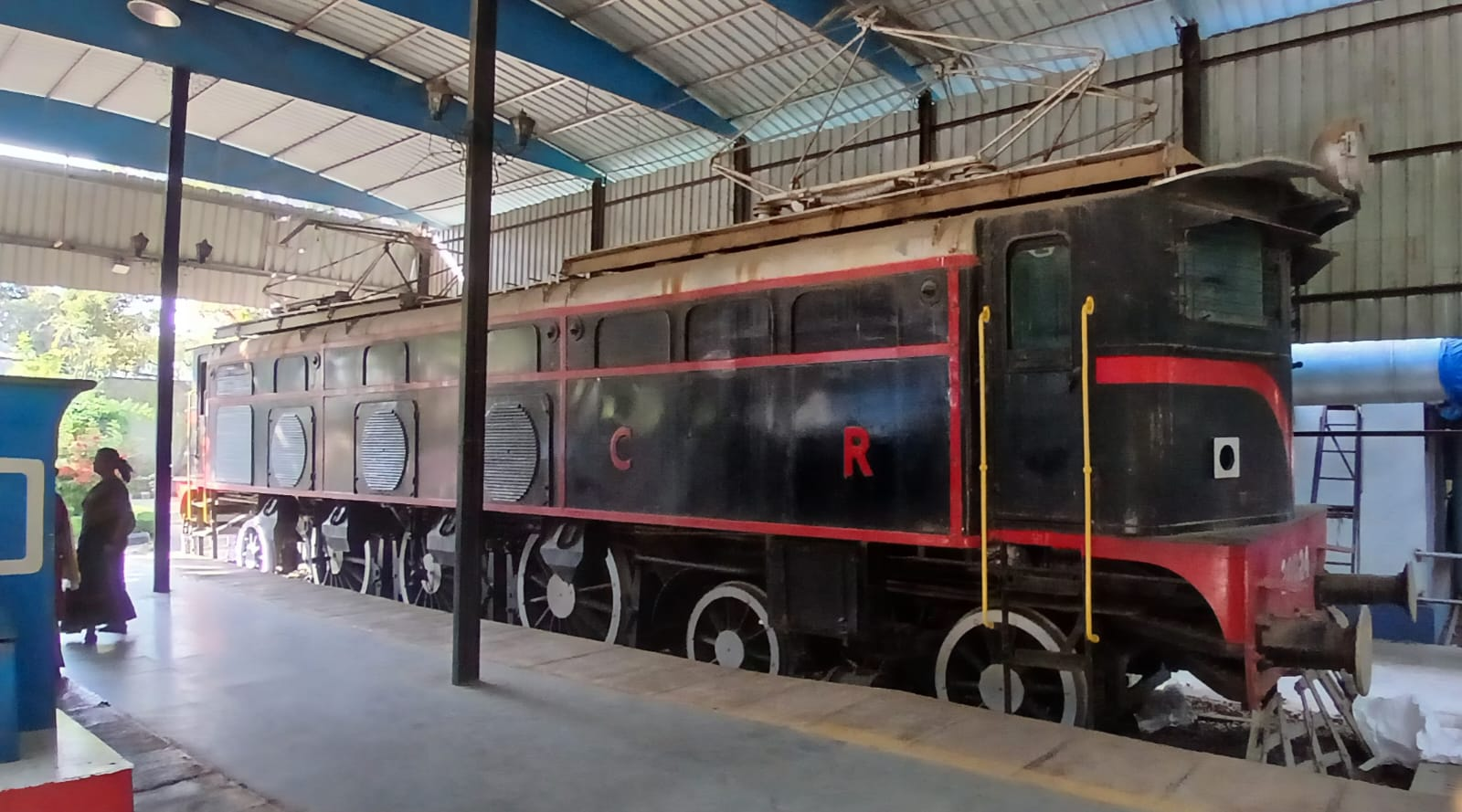
4025/20024 WCP-2 on display in Nehru Science Centre, Worli, Mumbai

The Indian locomotive class WCP-2 (originally classified as EA/2) is a 1.5 kV DC electric locomotive built in 1938 by Swiss Locomotive and Machine Works (SLM) for the Great Indian Peninsula Railway. The model name stands for broad gauge (W), Direct Current (C), Passenger traffic (P) engine, 2nd generation (2).

Essentially identical to the EA/1 (WCP-1), the lone WCP-2 served passenger trains until its withdrawal in the 1980s. Afterwards, it was donated to the Nehru Science Center in Worli, Mumbai.

== History ==
The electrification of the GIPR began in 1922. Powerful locomotives were required to transport the express trains on the mountain railway to overcome the Western Ghats. They also had to be able to reach speeds of 85 miles an hour (137 km/h) - a very high speed at that time, which was not even the case with the E 501 and 502 of the Paris-Orleans Railway had been requested. Three test locomotives were therefore ordered from different manufacturers in order to be able to select a suitable design for the series. The tender and evaluation was monitored by the UK electrical engineering firm Merz & McLellan in London.

The first WCP-1 was quite successful so in 1938, a single replica locomotive with the number 4025 was ordered, which had the same construction as the other locomotives, but was nevertheless classified in a new series. The electrical equipment from Metrovick was installed in the halls of the SLM in Winterthur. After the voltage test, the locomotive body was lifted off the driving wheels and the bogies and the engines removed. For transport, it was placed on two special bogies of an SBB flat bed wagon and shipped by rails to Antwerp, where it was loaded onto a cargo ship to India. In Bombay, the locomotive body was mounted back on the undercarriage and brought on its own wheels to the main workshop in GIPR, where the locomotive was fully assembled and then went into operation.

The locomotive remained in use until the 1980s and was given after being condemned at the Nehru Science Center in Bombay.

== Specification ==
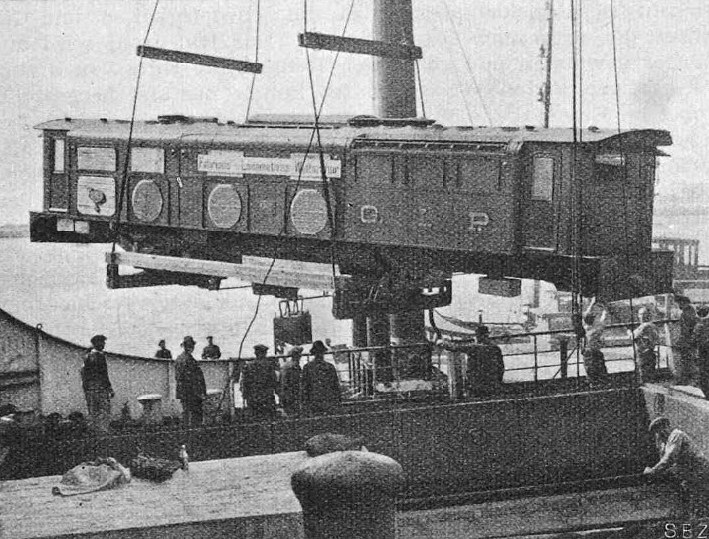
Loading of the locomotive body onto the cargo ship to India.

The locomotive has three individually driven axles, a two-axle bogie at one end and a single axle at the other end of the locomotive. The Winterthur bogie had a pivoting pivot that was centered with springs. The individual running axle was combined with the neighboring driving axle to form a Java bogie, which is why the locomotive had the axle sequence 2’Bo (A1) and not, as often written, 2’Co1.

Two drive motors each drive a drive axle via an SLM universal drive. The engines were arranged high in the engine room, which on the one hand gave the locomotive a favorable center of gravity, and on the other hand it protected it from damage during the frequent floods in Bombay when traveling through water. The engines could be removed laterally through maintenance openings in the lower area of the machine room side wall.

The locomotive's box extended the entire length of the frame. The engine room between the two cabs was divided into three rooms. The brake equipment with vacuum pump and the compressor with air reservoir were in the first room, the switchgear for the electro-pneumatic control was in the second room and the starting resistors were in the third room. The approach took place with all six traction motors connected in series, then two groups of three motors in series and finally three groups with two motors in series were formed. Two field weakening levels were available in each group, so that the locomotive had a total of nine continuous driving stages.

== See also ==
- Indian locomotive class WCP-1
- Indian locomotive class WCP-3
- Indian locomotive class WCP-4

== Bibliography ==
- Haut, F.J.G (January 2000). The Pictorial History of Electric Locomotives. Oak Tree Publications. ISBN 9780498076442 – via Internet Archive.
