= SBB Ae 4/6 =

Swiss (1A)Bo(A1) electric locomotive

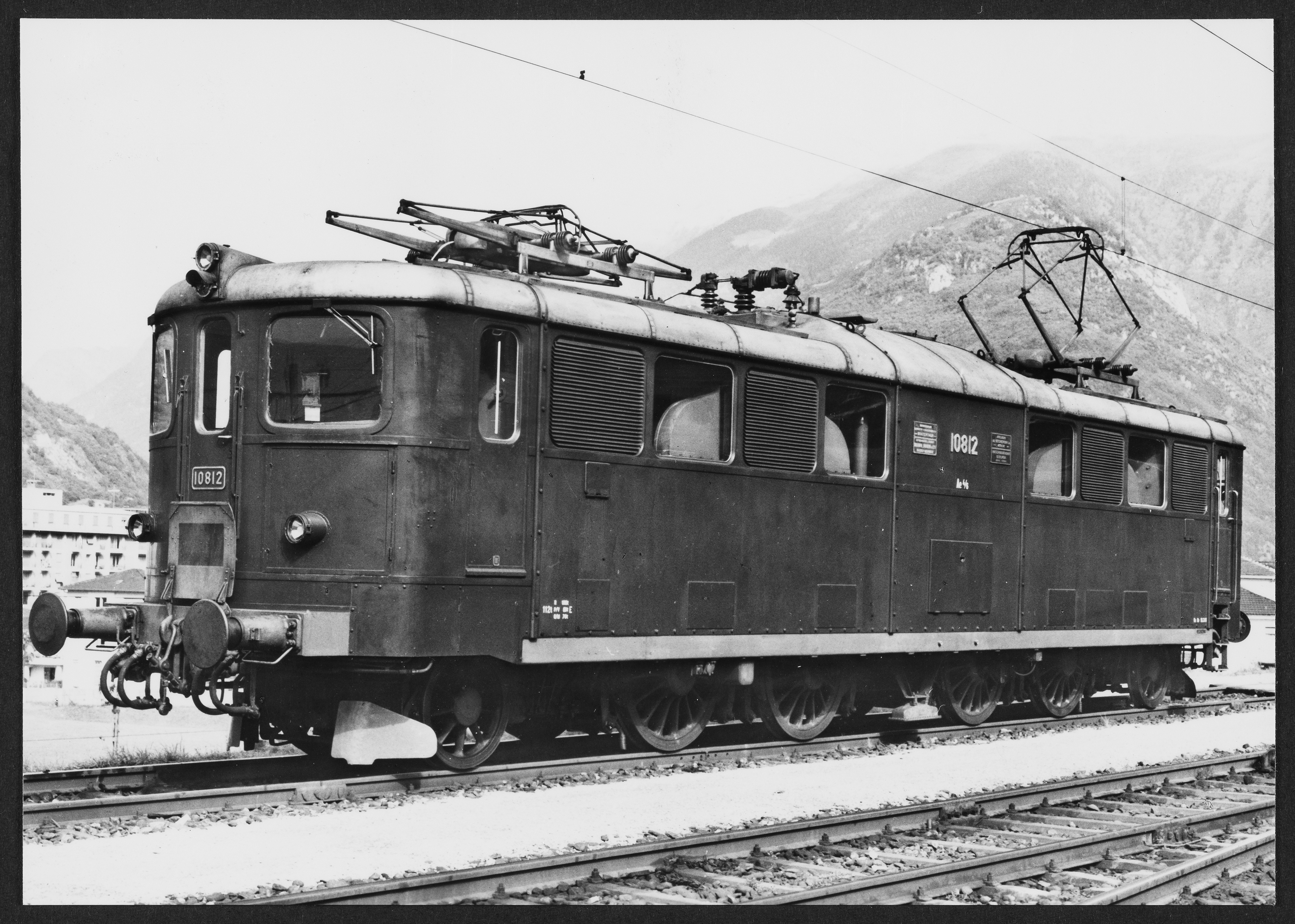
Type and origin
- Power type: Electric
- Builder: Swiss Locomotive and Machine Works (SLM), Brown, Boveri & Cie (BBC), Maschinenfabrik Oerlikon (MFO), Société Anonyme des Ateliers de Sécheron (SAAS)
- Build date: 1941–1945
- Total produced: 12
- Rebuild date: 1961-1966
Specifications
- Configuration
  - UIC: (1A)Bo(A1)
- Gauge: 1,435 mm (4 ft 8 1/2 in)
- Wheelbase: 12.2 metres (40 ft)
- Length
  - Over couplers: 17.26 metres (56 ft 8 in)
- Width: 3 metres (9 ft 10 in)
- Height: 4.065 metres (13 ft 4.0 in)
- Adhesive weight: 83 tonnes (82 long tons; 91 short tons)
- Loco weight: 105 tonnes (103 long tons; 116 short tons); 111 tonnes (109 long tons; 122 short tons) After rebuilding
- Electric system/s: 15 kV 16 2/3 Hz AC Catenary
- Current pickup(s): Pantograph
- Gear ratio: 1:3.19
- Train brakes: Air
Performance figures
- Maximum speed: 125 kilometres per hour (78 mph); 110 kilometres per hour (68 mph) After rebuilding
- Power output
  - Continuous: 3,848 kilowatts (5,160 hp)
- Tractive effort
  - Starting: 218 kilonewtons (49,000 lb_{f})
  - Continuous: 172 kilonewtons (39,000 lb_{f})
Career
- Numbers: 10801–10812

The Swiss locomotive class Ae 4/6 was a class of electric locomotives. They were intended as a powerful locomotive for the steep gradients of the Gotthard Railway, but smaller than the huge 'double locomotives' which had previously been tested there. They were built from 1941, during World War II, and although Switzerland remained neutral through this, material shortages led to some quality problems with these locomotives.

== Origins ==
The SBB Ae 4/6 was needed for service on the steep gradients of the Gotthard Railway. Electric locomotives were needed, rather than steam, both because of Switzerland's dependence on imported coal, and also because of the ventilation problems in long tunnels. Existing electric types, such as the Ce 6/8^{I}, Ce 6/8^{II} 'crocodiles' and the Be 4/6 of the early 1920s had been powerful enough for the gradients, but their use of a coupling rod drive limited their speed. A new express passenger locomotive would require independent traction motors for each axle.

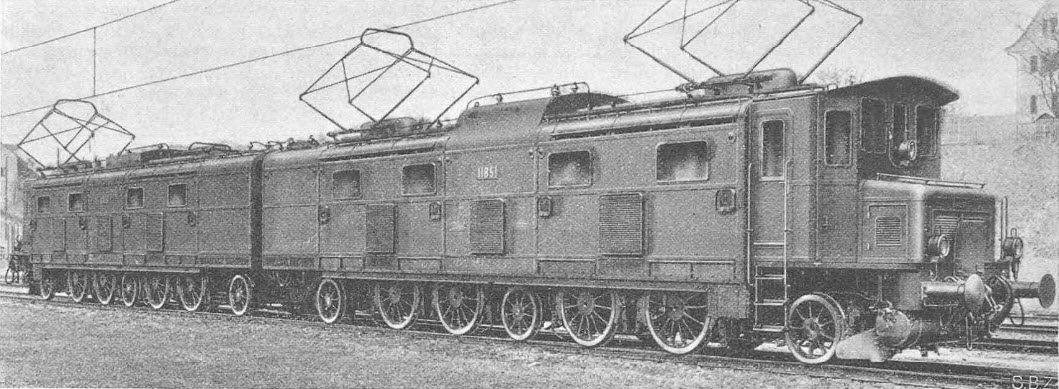
The enormous Ae 8/14 'double locomotive' and its (1A)A1A(A1)+(1A)A1A(A1) layout

In the 1930s, three new prototype 'double locomotives' were produced, the Ae 8/14. These were faster, from the previous 75 kilometres per hour (47 mph) to 100 kilometres per hour (62 mph), and abandoned rod drives in favour of separate motors and Buchli drives, or later the Winterthur universal drive, to each axle. The last of these was the LandiLok, with a modern streamlined bodyshell. These locomotives were powerful, but also inflexible, and only heavy goods trains, rather than the intended passenger expresses, could make use of their full power.

== Design ==
=== Precursors and the 'Java bogie' ===
Plan view of an (1A)Bo(A1), showing the articulated 'Java bogies' at each end

The SBB Ae 4/6 design originates with four ESS 3000 express passenger locomotives, built by Swiss Locomotive and Machine Works (SLM) and Brown, Boveri & Cie. (BBC) in 1924 in Switzerland for the Electrische Staats Spoorwegen of Java. They were a development of the rigid-framed 1′Do1′ arrangement, but Jakob Buchli articulated this at each end, giving rise to their name of the 'Java bogie' for this (1A)Bo(A1) form.

Only a few examples of the (1A)Bo(A1) were ever built. The bogie was arranged so that the pivot axis was just behind the pivoted driven axle. The axles were driven by Buchli drives, to permit suspension movement, and as the pivot was so close to the axle this linkage could also absorb the bogie's movement, as the driven axle twisted in place but did not move sideways by much.

==== Gotthard 'double locomotives' ====
A derivative design of this layout was used for the Swiss Ae 8/14 'double locomotives' of 1931, built for heavy freight service on the steep gradients of the Gotthard Railway. These consisted of two articulated units as (1A)A1A(A1)+(1A)A1A(A1). A further unpowered carrying axle was also provided, splitting the central Bo group into A1A, which was needed by the extra weight of the transformer for the Swiss low frequency AC system. Again this was only a small class of three locomotives classed as SBB Ae 8/14, although each of the three was different. The first used the same Buchli drives, but from the second they introduced the Winterthur universal drive, with paired traction motors driving each axle through a single central gear. This could be adapted more easily to the articulation. A drawback to the sheer size of these locomotives is that there were few trains heavy enough to require them, and when used to the full they were at risk of over-straining their couplings.

The third of these was built as the 'LandiLok' and exhibited at the Swiss National Exhibition of 1939.

The SBB, however, saw disadvantages in huge locomotives and concluded their needs could best be served by smaller locomotives operating with multiple control. This prompted the tender for the Ae 4/6.

=== SBB Ae 4/6 ===
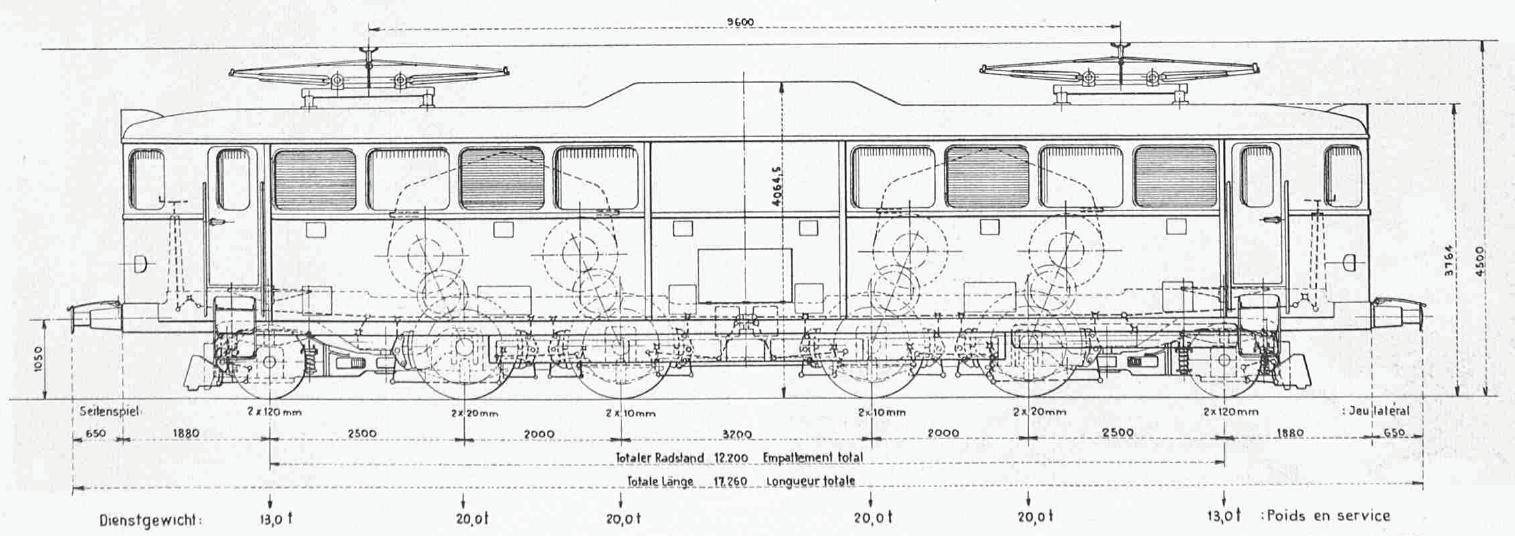
Side view general arrangement drawing

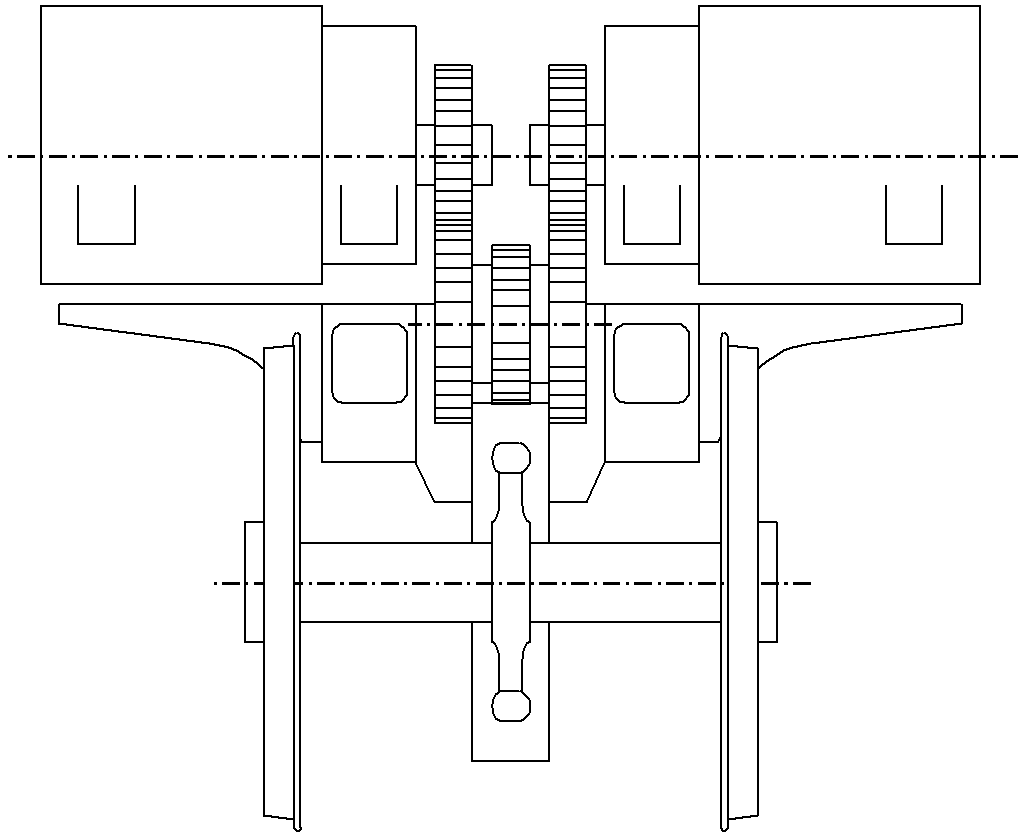
Section through the Winterthur drive

The Ae 4/6 was derived from half of the 'double locomotive', with a more modern flat-fronted cab at each end. Weight saving in the traction motors allowed a return to the (1A)Bo(A1) layout, with the Java bogie and the Winterthur drive, and avoiding the central carrying axle.

They were also intended for use on the Gotthard route, but more flexibly as they could be used as individual units for lighter trains, or run in multiple as pairs for heavier trains. Multiple control equipment was fitted from the outset, although not much used in service as both it, and the locos, were considered unreliable. This was also the first class to be driven from the left of the cab, rather than the right.

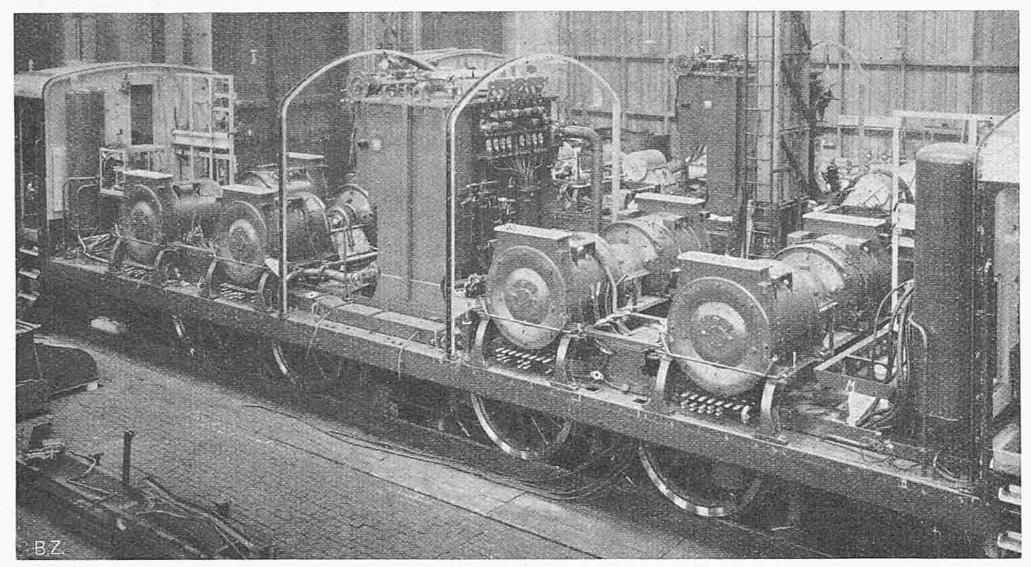
SBB Ae 4/6, with Winterthur drive

Both these and the Ae 8/14 had used regenerative braking, useful for descending the Gotthard's steep gradients without overheating and also returning electrical power to the network. The Ae 4/6 had a simplified and lighter system, where one traction motor could serve as the exciter for the others during braking. They were also built with aluminium windings in the transformer and motors, rather than copper, owing to wartime shortages. Aluminium was also used for some parts of the frame and bodyshell.

A problem with the Ae 8/14 was that it had a large number of transformer tappings, and could only change slowly between them. This limited their best acceleration, no matter how light the train, to a minimum of a minute to reach full speed. The Ae 4/6 avoided this by using fewer tappings, with faster actuation between them. An air-blast main high voltage circuit breaker was also used.

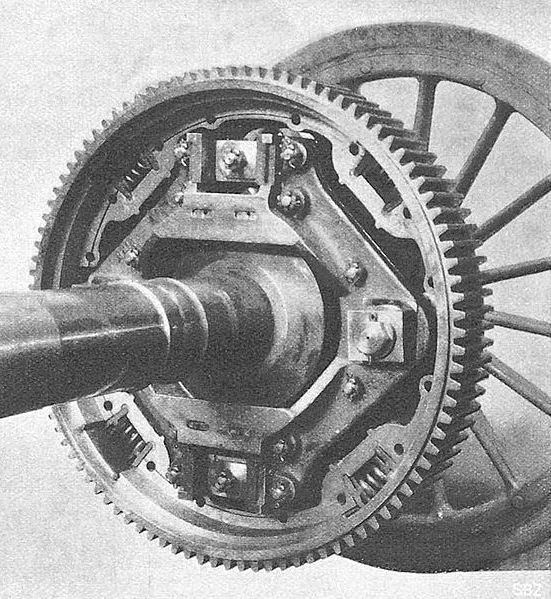
Flexible links of the Winterthur drive wheel

The Winterthur drive is a geared drive on the centreline of the locomotive, giving room for a traction motor each side, two to an axle. The two motors were geared by spur gears to a central layshaft carrying a third gear which drove a drive wheel on the axle. This drive wheel was not fixed rigidly, but was connected to the axle by four pivoted links in a square arrangement. The large number of gears used, and that these were straight-cut spur gears, led to high noise levels. When combined with some issues from wartime construction, the drive transmissions were not perfectly reliable.

In service, the Ae 4/6 performed well in some aspects for measured power, but had problems with a lack of adhesion and mechanical unreliability. Some aspects of their wartime construction may have reduced their mechanical build quality, leading to high noise levels in the final drives, and a susceptibility to overheated bearings and gear failures, particularly after wheelslip.

== Service ==
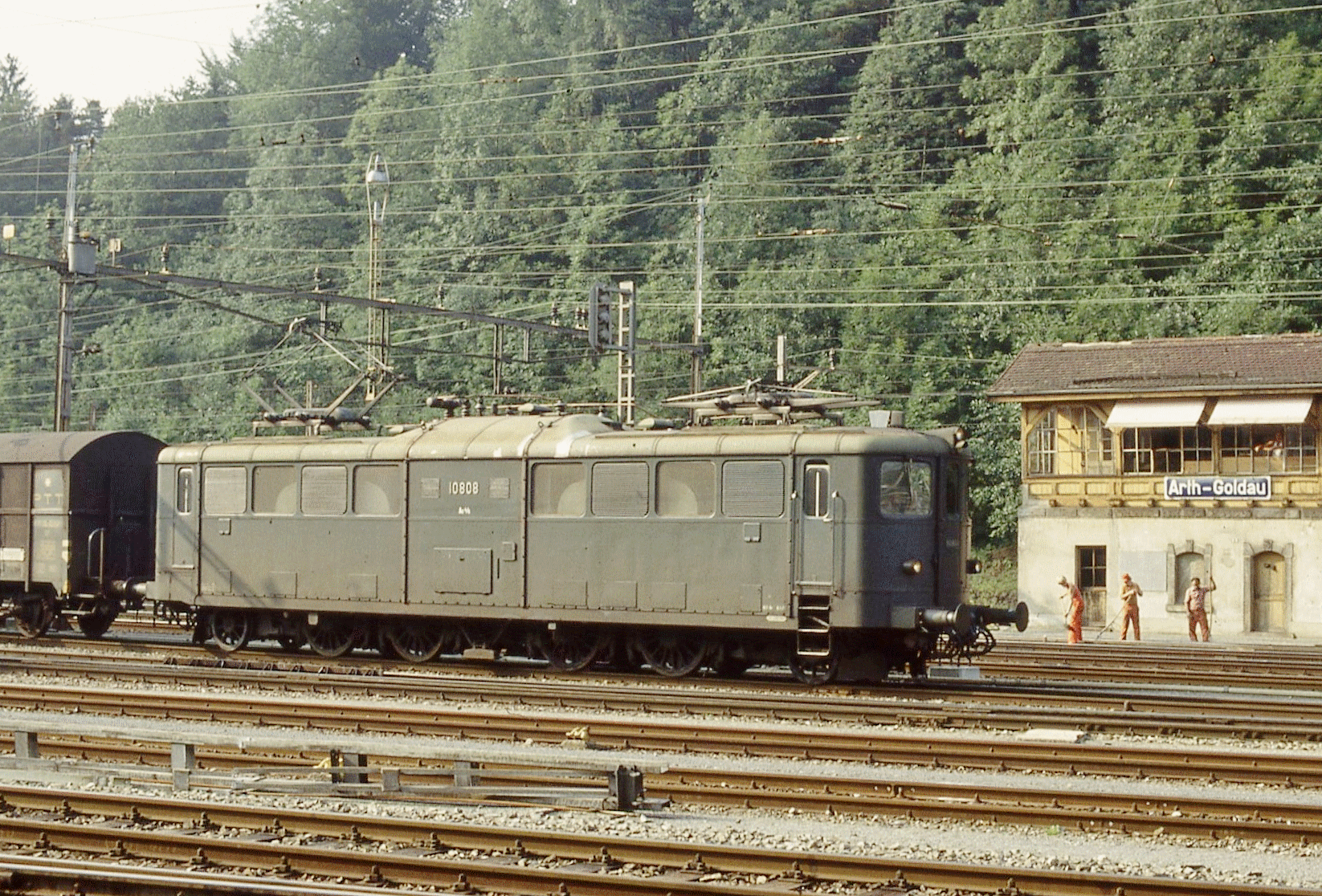
10808 at Arth-Goldau

=== Construction ===
Construction was by Swiss Locomotive and Machine Works (SLM) for the mechanical construction and Brown, Boveri & Cie (BBC), Maschinenfabrik Oerlikon (MFO) and Société Anonyme des Ateliers de Sécheron (SAAS) for the electrical equipment. They were built in two batches, the first six being delivered in 1941–1942, the second six in 1944–1945. They were painted in forest green and never changed color throughout their service lives.

=== Weaknesses ===
Analysis of the operating history of the series reveals the following design deficiencies:

- The prototypes revealed that the Java Bogies did not perform well at high speeds. Their running axles side-to-side play destabilized straight running of the driving axles. This was improved in the production series units by redesigning the bogie with less lateral play in the running axles. The middle driving axles, though on their own bogie, became fixed along the axis of the locomotive body, removing them of any track guidance role.
- Despite improvements to the running gear, the engines had trouble cornering at high speed. The design speed of 125 km/h was never achieved.
- Drive axle breakage was common with the series. This arose from high traction motor torques on the axles and from yaw on the drivers arising from wet track and slippage. These motions also ruined their bearings.
- The SLM universal drives axles were noisy and wore badly with the axle yaw. Excessive gear wear led to costly workshop repairs.
- Under multiple-unit operation, inductive crosstalk between the control cables linking the two locomotives frequently shut down the slave.
- Weak battery charging capacity thwarted multiple-unit operation because the charging was done by a single locomotive. Consequently, enthusiasm waned for multiple control operation.
- The drive axle bearings were incapable of shouldering the loads placed upon them. Wartime restrictions prevented the use of roller bearings, which might have worked better. Unfortunately, they could not be retrofitted during the later rebuild phase.

Some of these problems were remedied when the locomotives in the last half of the series were rebuilt around 1960. The lessons learned with the Ae 4/6, however, informed the design of the much more successful Re 4/4^{I}, which followed.

=== Rebuilding ===
The second batch, 10807–10812, were rebuilt between 1961 and 1966 to try and improve their reliability. The flexible drive wheels of the Winterthur Drives were replaced with Brown Boveri spring drives, as were used for the Ae 6/6 This also reduced their top speed and increased their weight.

=== Operation ===
Number	Commissioning	Withdrawal
10801	26 April 1941	July 1965
10802	14 June 1941	February 1977
10803	26 May 1941	October 1980
10804	25 July 1941	October 1980
10805	12 September 1942	May 1983
10806	31 December 1942	October 1982
10807	31 August 1944	February 1977
10808	1 November 1944	March 1981
10809	5 April 1945	March 1981
10810	31 May 1945	April 1982
10811	27 March 1945	May 1983
10812	5 February 1945	December 1982

The locomotives were in service from their arrival until the mid-1960s. With a 375-tonne (369-long-ton; 413-short-ton) train, they could reach a speed of 75 km/h (47 mph) on a 26‰ gradient.

In the mid-1960s, the Ae 4/6s began to be replaced in first-line service by their successors, the Ae 6/6. The first out of service withdrawals begin in 1977. Selling the whole class to Südostbahn (SOB) was considered in 1980, but their lack of adhesive weight went against them, compared to a more modern bogie locomotive. The SOB operated heavy biannual pilgrimage trains to Einsiedeln Abbey, using Re 4/4^{III} for the 5% gradients – nearly twice those of the Gotthard. The Ae 4/6 was considered for this as it was powerful enough, but their poor adhesion meant that more Re 4/4^{III} were bought instead.

=== NS 1000 ===
A Dutch class, the NS 1000, were ordered from the same makers but were delayed by the war until 1948. Three were built by SLM, but the remainder were licence-built by Werkspoor in the Netherlands. Although designed as passenger locomotives with a top speed of 160 kilometres per hour (99 mph), they were soon found to be unreliable when used at speed and spent their working lives restricted to 100 kilometres per hour (62 mph) and mostly freight services. Despite this, they stayed in service until 1982.

=== Accidents ===
- 10802, 24 December 1947 in Oerlikon.
- 10807 and Ce 6/8^{III}, 27 May 1950 in Maroggia. One of the drivers was killed.
- 10802 and a Be 4/6 No. 12339, May 30, 1954, in Castione. There was a single fatality.
- 10808, 8 August 1958 in Muri (Aargau).
- 10801, 9 July 1965 in Maroggia.

=== Withdrawal ===
After 10801's fire in 1965, it was scrapped.

General withdrawals began with 10802 and 10807 in 1977, then the whole class was withdrawn from 1980 and scrapped at Biasca, the last in 1983.

None were preserved, although one side of a driving cab is preserved in the Museum of Transport at Lucerne.
