= Indian locomotive class WCG-1 =

Class of 41 Indian electric locomotives

GIPR EF/1 Indian locomotive class WCG-1
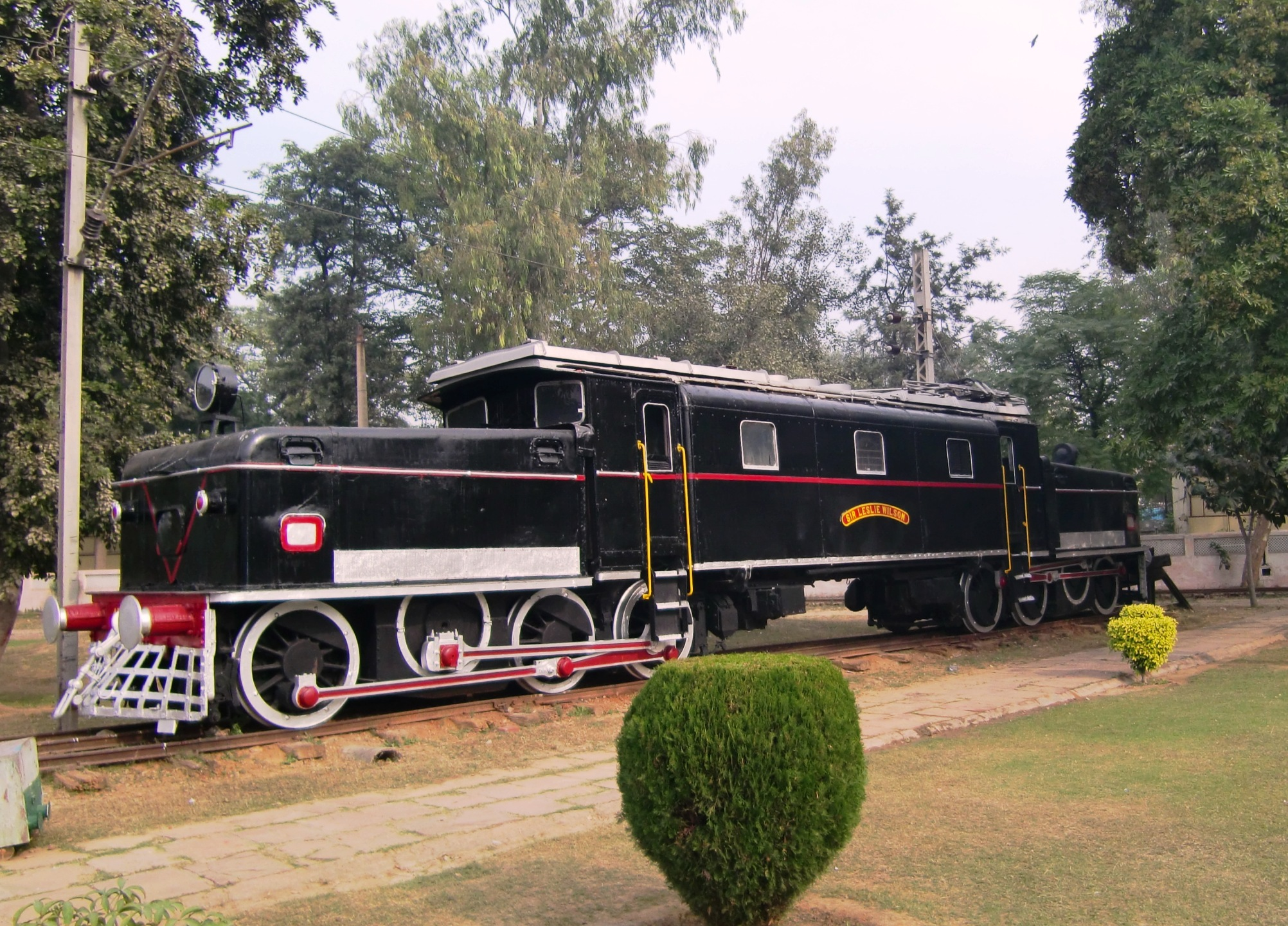
- GIPR 4502 preserved at National Rail Museum, New Delhi
Type and origin
- Power type: Electric
- Designer: Vulcan Foundry, Swiss Locomotive and Machine Works
- Builder: Vulcan Foundry, Swiss Locomotive and Machine Works
- Order number: M3559/53261/51
- Model: EF/1
- Build date: 1928–1929
- Total produced: 41
Specifications
- Configuration
  - UIC: C′C′
  - Commonwealth: C-C
- Gauge: 5 ft 6 in (1,676 mm)
- Wheel diameter: New:1,220 mm (4 ft 0 in), Half worn:1,182 mm (3 ft 10 1/2 in) and Full worn:1,114 mm (3 ft 8 in)
- Wheelbase: 4,596 mm (15 ft 1 in)
- Length
  - Over couplers: 20.142 m (66 ft 1 in)
- Width: 3.169 m (10 ft 4 3/4 in)
- Height: 4.292 m (14 ft 1 in)
- Axle load: 20.50 tonnes (20.18 long tons; 22.60 short tons)
- Loco weight: 123.00 tonnes (121.06 long tons; 135.58 short tons)
- Power supply: 110 V DC
- Electric system/s: 1.5 kV DC Overhead
- Current pickup(s): pantograph
- Loco brake: Air/Hand, Regenerative braking
- Train brakes: Vacuum
Performance figures
- Maximum speed: 80 km/h (50 mph)
- Power output: Max: 2,600 hp (1,940 kW)
- Tractive effort
  - Starting: 30,482 kgf (300 kN)
  - 1 hour: 25,481 kgf (250 kN)
  - Continuous: 18,144 kgf (180 kN)
Career
- Operators: Indian Railways
- Class: EF/1
- Numbers: GIPR 4500–4540; IR 20027–20067
- Locale: Central Railways
- Delivered: 1930
- First run: 1930
- Last run: 2000 as shunters
- Retired: January 2000
- Withdrawn: Early 2000
- Preserved: 2
- Scrapped: May 2000
- Current owner: National Rail Museum, New Delhi
- Disposition: Two preserved, remainder scrapped

The Indian locomotive class WCG-1 (originally classified as EF/1) is a class of 1.5 kV DC freight-hauling electric locomotives that were developed in the late 1920s by Vulcan Foundry and Swiss Locomotive and Machine Works (SLM) for the Great Indian Peninsula Railway. A total of 41 WCG-1 locomotives were built in England between 1928 and 1929.

The WCG-1s served for nearly 70 years and were withdrawn by the early 2000s, with two of the locomotives being preserved, while the rest of the units being scrapped.

== History ==
The electrification of the line from Kalyan to Pune and Igatpuri in the 1920s required powerful electric locomotives to handle trains over the 1 in 37 grade. With the order being made in 1926, the first 10 locomotives were built by SLM in Winterthur, and the remaining 31 were built by Vulcan Foundry in Newton-le-Willows. The electrical components of all 41 locomotives was built by Metrovick, based on drawings by Brown, Boveri & Cie, Baden, Switzerland. These were the first electric locomotives built by Vulcan Foundry.

The locomotives were used in front of freight trains on the GIPR's Bombay-Pune and Bombay-Igatpuri routes, but were also assigned to bank trains on the up to 3% steep Bhor Ghat gradient. They were referred to by the staff as खेकडा [Khēkaḍā], English 'crab', and distinguished themselves by being able to negotiate curves well on mountain ranges. It is often mentioned by locals that the locomotives made a strange moaning sound when standing and made a wiping sound when driving, which was typical for most crocodile locomotives.

From 1974 the WCG-1s were only used in shunting in Bombay and Lonavla, where the last locomotives were still in use in 1992. In Bombay they were located in the Wadi Bunder depot near the Bombay Victoria terminus and were mainly used to assemble passenger trains.

The first locomotive was named Sir Leslie Wilson, who was governor of Bombay from 1923 to 1928. The nameplate is fitted on locomotive no. 4502, which is on display in the National Rail Museum of India.

== Design ==
The total weight of the locomotive was 123 t, with the mechanical components weighing 72.25 t and the electrical components 50.75 t.

The locomotive has two bogies with three coupled axles, which were driven by an SLM inclined rod drive. The drive axle was the third axle in the bogie, the drive was from a double drive motor via a blind shaft, which is arranged between axes 1 and 2, on the drive and coupling rods. The two powered bogies, on which the pulling and pushing devices were also attached, had lower structures in which the traction motors and the reversing switches were housed. The locomotive box with the two cabs connected the two powered bogies. The locomotive was able to drive arches with a radius of 500 ft (150 m).

The 650 hp traction motors had winding designed for 1500 V. The following groupings were possible: all four motors connected in series and two motors in series connection in parallel to the other two motors in series connection all traction motors in parallel. The electro-pneumatic control had nine speed levels - three in each grouping. There was also an electric useful brake that worked in the speed range from 8 mph (13 km/h) to 35 mph (56 km/h). The excitation of the traction motors was ensured by an axle generator.

The locomotive was fitted with a vacuum brake, the brake of the locomotive itself being designed as a vacuum-controlled compressed air brake. There were two vacuum pumps and two piston compressors, the compressors being driven by 1500 V motors supplied directly with the contact line voltage. The sand spreaders working with compressed air discharge could be operated via a pedal. The pantographs could be raised and lowered using a manually operated compressed air valve. A compressed air pipe was available as an acoustic warning device.

== Preserved examples ==
Class	Manufacturer	Loco Number	Previous shed	Name	Livery	Location	ref
WCG-1	SLM and Vulcan Foundry	4502/20063	Wadi Bunder	Sir Leslie Wilson	Black	Preserved at National Rail Museum, New Delhi	
WCG-1	Vulcan Foundry and SLM	20067	Wadi Bunder		Black	Preserved at Heritage Gully, CSTM	

== Gallery ==
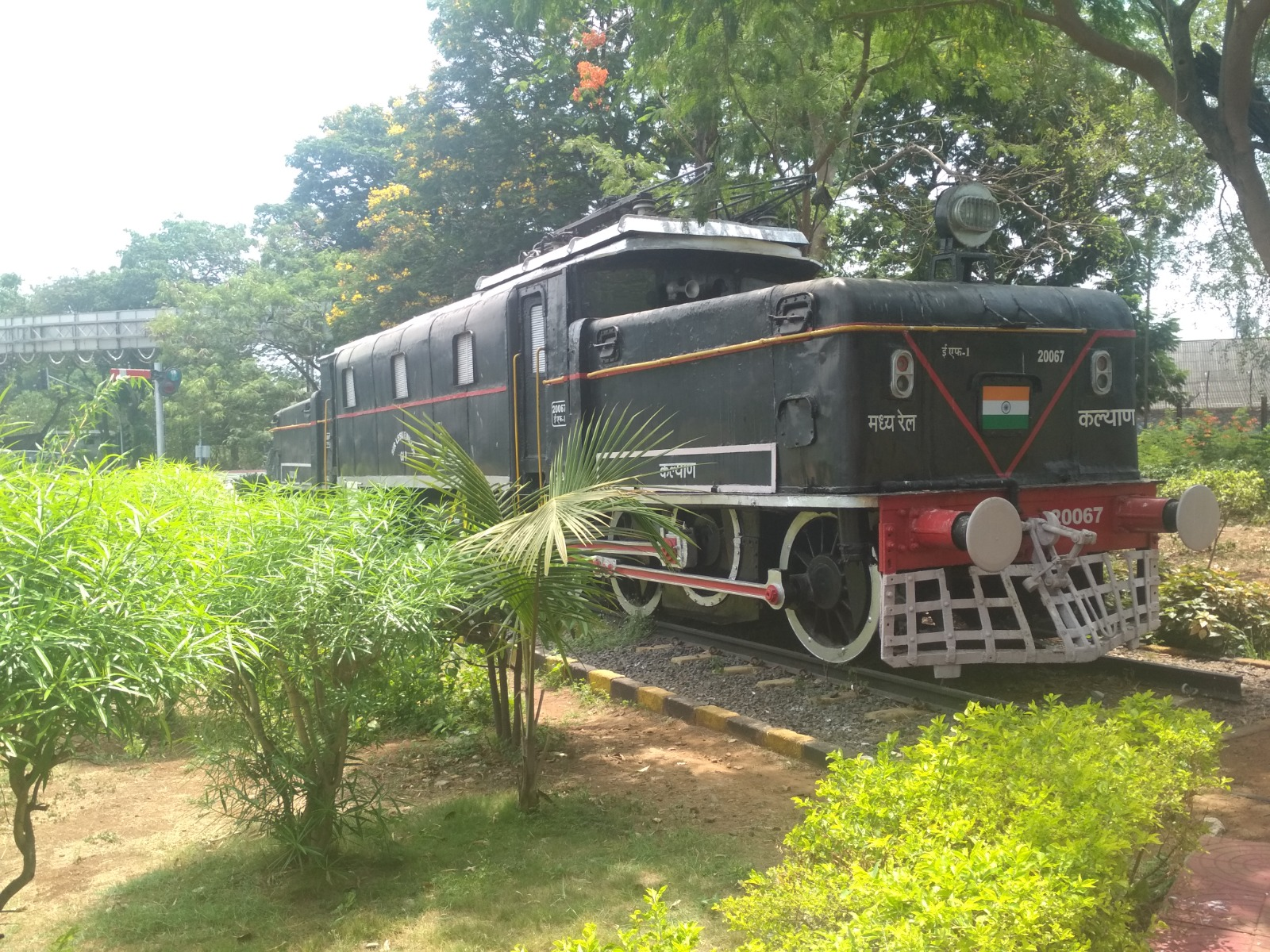
One of the surviving EF-1 (WCG-1) locos at the Heritage Gully at CSMT. View from Cab-1 Side

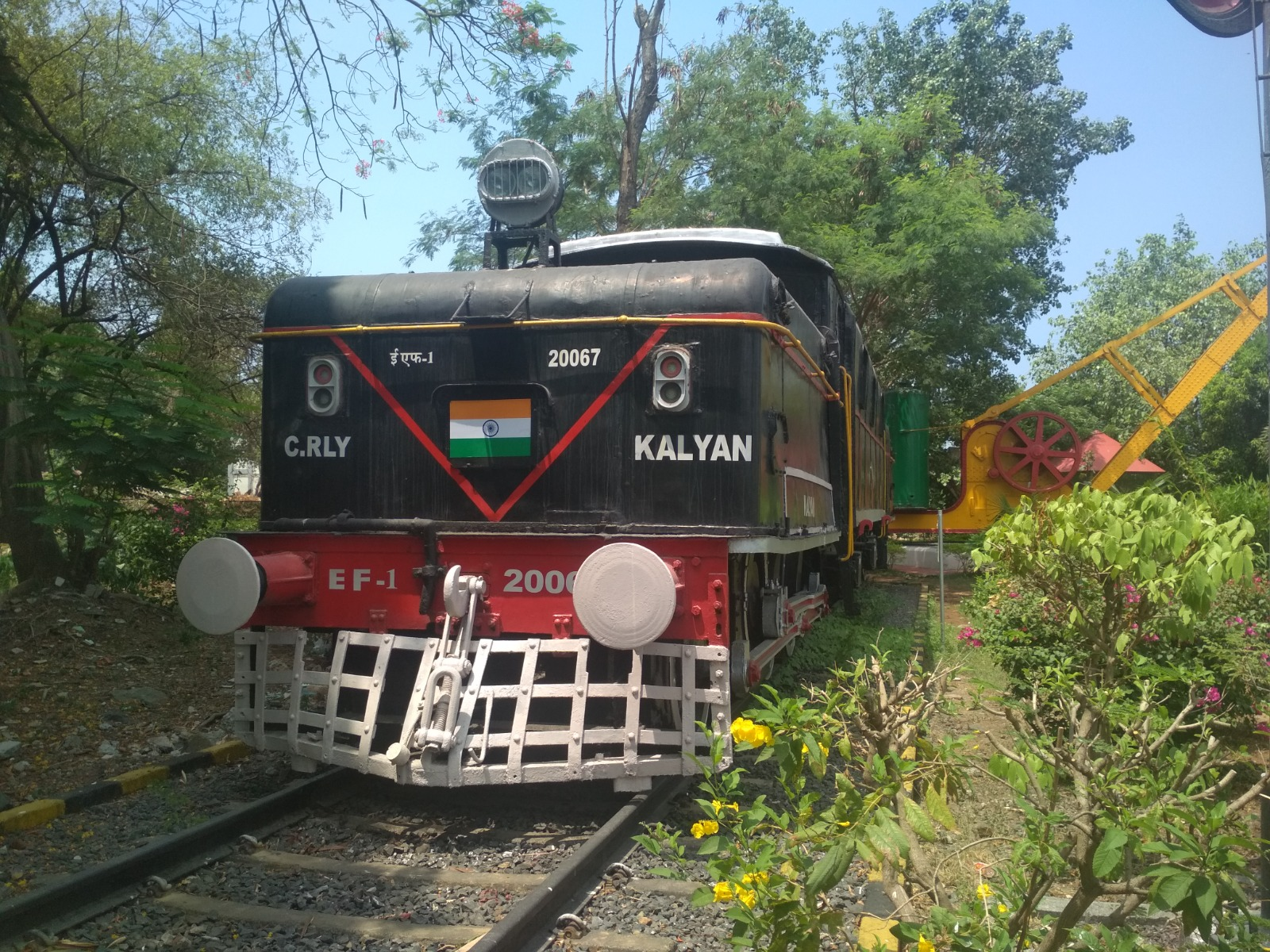
One of the surviving EF-1 (WCG-1) locos at the Heritage Gully at CSMT. View from its Cab-2 Side

== See also ==
- Indian locomotive class WCP-1
- Indian locomotive class WCP-2
- Indian locomotive class WCP-3
- Indian locomotive class WCP-4
- Indian locomotive class YCG-1

== Bibliography ==
- Haut, F.J.G (January 2000). The Pictorial History of Electric Locomotives. Oak Tree Publications. ISBN 9780498076442 – via Internet Archive.
