= Indian locomotive class WCP-1 =

Class of 22 Indian electric locomotives

GIPR EA/1 IR WCP-1
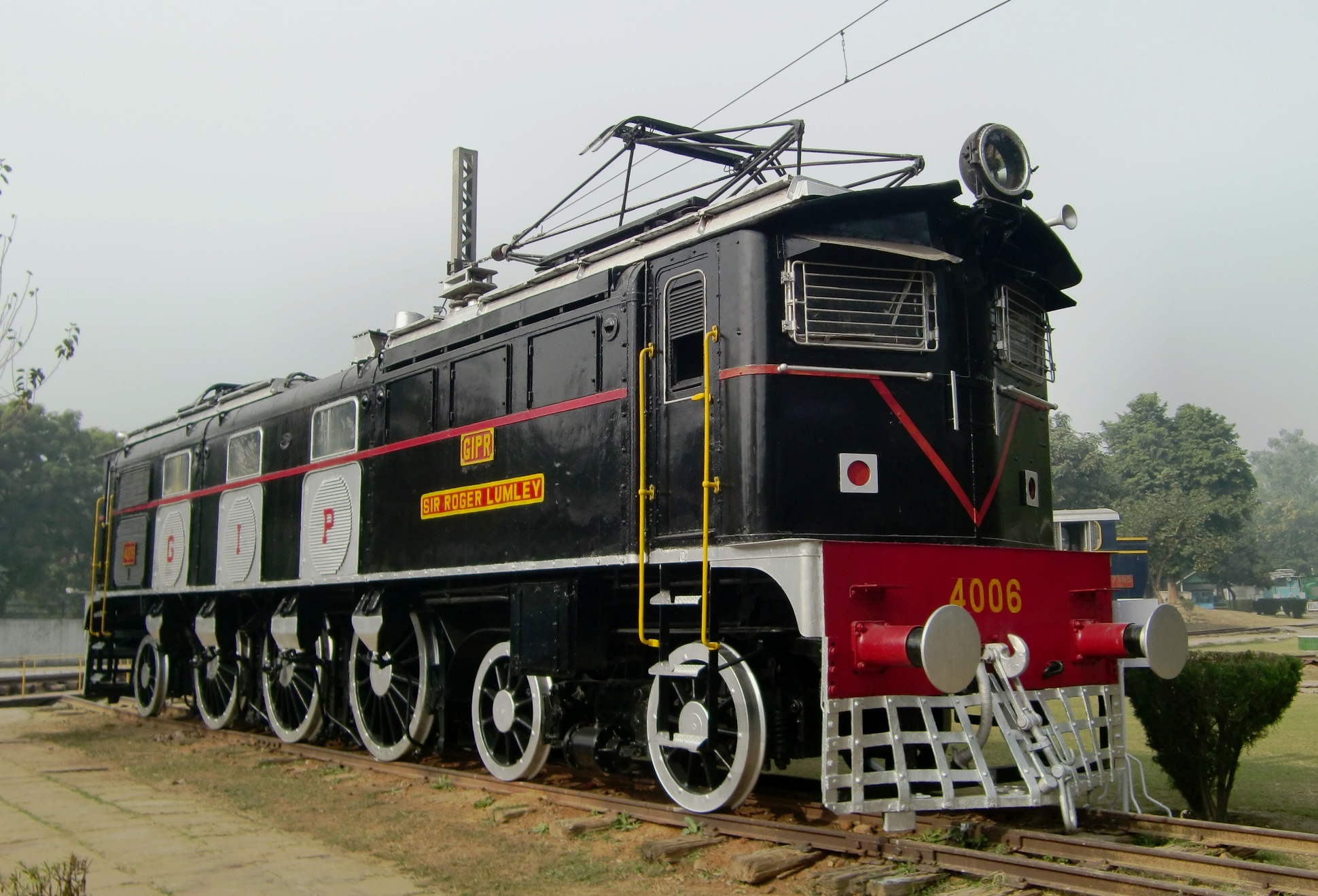
- GIPR 4006 at the National Rail Museum, New Delhi
Type and origin
- Power type: Electric
- Builder: SLM, Metrovick
- Build date: 1928–1930
- Total produced: 22
Specifications
- Configuration
  - UIC: 2′Bo(A1)
- Gauge: 1,676 mm (5 ft 6 in)
- Wheel diameter: 1,600 mm (5 ft 3 in)
- Wheelbase: 11.883 m (38 ft 11 3/4 in)
- Length: 16.300 m (53 ft 5 3/4 in)
- Adhesive weight: 60 t (59 long tons; 66 short tons)
- Loco weight: 100 t (98 long tons; 110 short tons)
- Electric system/s: 1500 V DC
- Current pickup: Overhead lines
- Traction motors: Six
- Transmission: SLM universal drive
Performance figures
- Maximum speed: 137 km/h (85 mph)
- Power output
  - 1 hour: 2,095 hp (1,562 kW; 2,124 PS)
  - Continuous: 1,830 hp (1,360 kW; 1,860 PS)
- Tractive effort
  - Starting: 150 kN (34,000 lbf)
Career
- Operators: Great Indian Peninsula Railway; Indian Railways
- Numbers: GIPR 4000, 4003–4024; IR 20002–20023
- Withdrawn: 1980s
- Current owner: National Rail Museum, New Delhi
- Disposition: One preserved, remainder scrapped

The Indian locomotive class WCP-1 (originally classified as EA/1) is a class of 1.5 kV DC electric locomotives that were developed in late 1920s by Swiss Locomotive and Machine Works (SLM) for the Great Indian Peninsula Railway to handle passenger trains. A total of 22 WCP-1s were built in England between 1928 and 1929, and entered service in 1930.

The WCP-1 served passenger trains for nearly 50 years until its withdrawal in the early 1980s. Only one locomotive, GIPR 4006, is preserved at the National Rail Museum, with the remainder of the units being scrapped.

== History ==
The electrification of the Great Indian Peninsula Railway began in 1922, and powerful locomotives were required to haul express trains on over the Western Ghats. They also had to be able to reach speeds of 85 miles an hour (137 km/h) - a very high speed at that time, which was not even the case with the E 501 and 502 of the Compagnie du chemin de fer de Paris à Orléans had been requested. Three test locomotives were therefore ordered from different manufacturers in order to be able to select a suitable design for the series. The tender and evaluation was monitored by the UK electrical engineering firm Merz & McLellan in London.

The Great Indian Peninsula Railway ordered the test locomotives in 1923:

- Number 4000, a 2'Bo(A1) locomotive with the Winterthur universal drive, built by SLM and Metropolitan Vickers and designated as EA/1.
- Number 4001, a 2'Co2' Quill drive locomotive, built by Hawthorn Leslie and Company and General Electric Company and designated as EB/1, later known as the WCP-3.
- Number 4002, another Hawthorn Leslie 2'Co2', with the difference being that it had Buchli drive, and was jointly built by Brown Boveri. It was designated EC/1, later WCP-4.

The EA/1 was ultimately selected for serial production, with 21 more locomotives of this design being ordered. On June 1, 1930, number 4006 hauled a seven-coach Deccan Queen over the newly electrified line to Pune, then known as Poona.

== Design ==
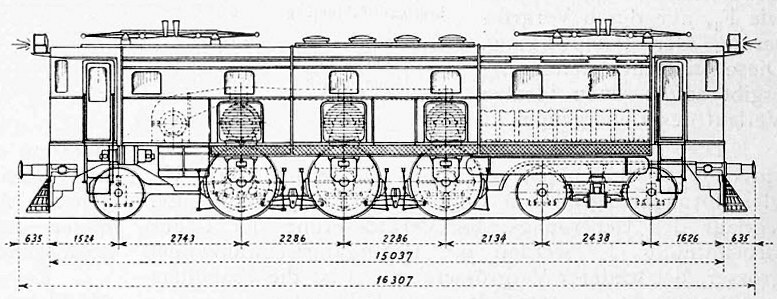
Drawing diagram for the EA/1 (WCP-1)

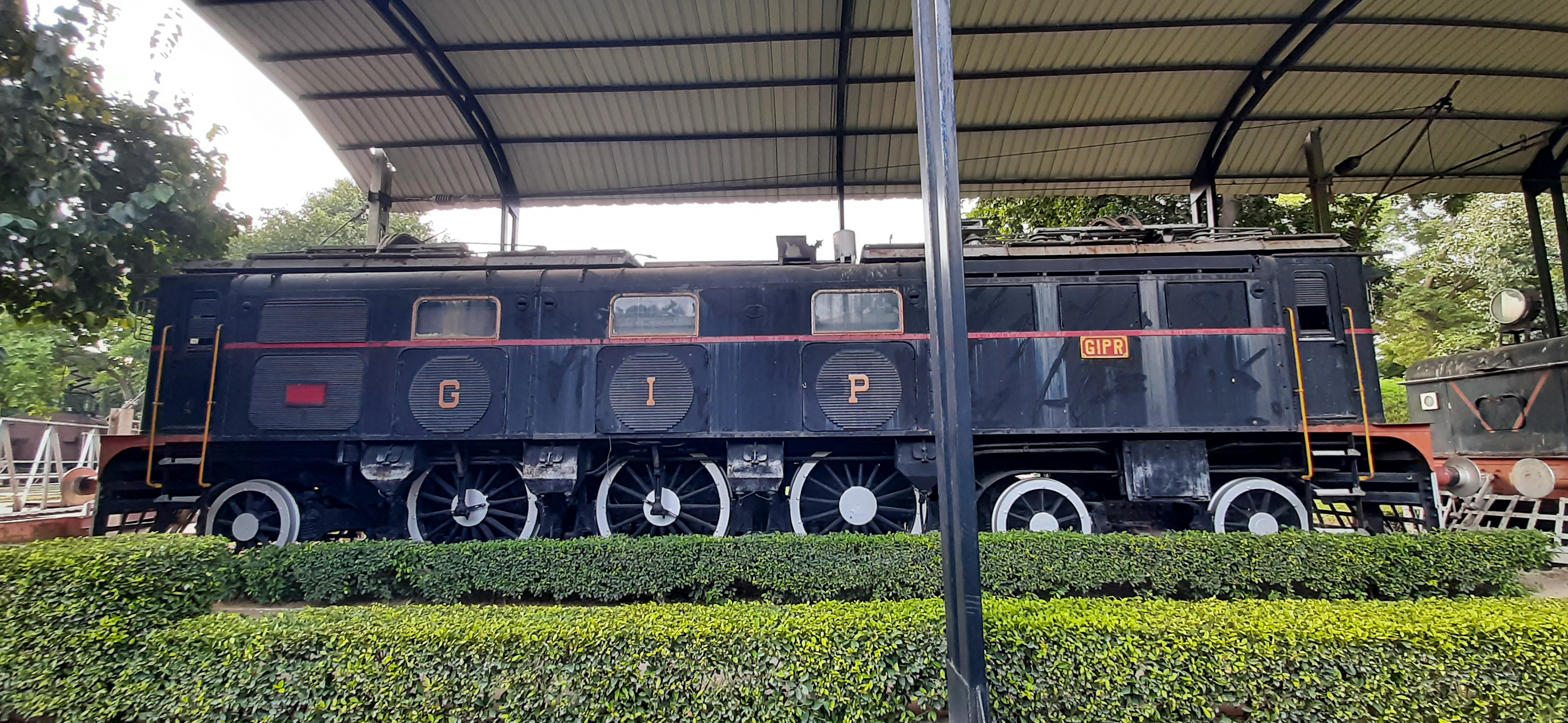
Side view of no.20005

The EA/1 had three driving axles in the middle, a two-axle pilot bogie on one end, and a single trailing axle on the other end, which was joined in a Zara bogie with the nearest pair of driving wheels.

Two traction motors each drove a driving axle via a universal drive The motors were mounted high in the engine room, which gave the locomotive a high center of gravity and protect it from water damage during the frequent floods in Bombay. The motors could be removed from the side through maintenance openings in the lower part of the engine room side wall.

The locomotive's body spanned the entire length of the frame. The middle section between the two cabs was divided into three rooms. The first room housed the braking equipment with vacuum pump and air reservoir, the second room contained a cam-operated switch and other equipment for the control gear, and the third room contained the starting resistors. Control scheme was achieved with all six serially connected traction motors, two parallel groups of three motors each in series, or three groups of two motors each in series. In each grouping two field weakening stages were available, so that the locomotive had a total of nine continuous driving stages.

== See also ==
- Rail transport in India § History
- Indian locomotive class WCG-1
- Indian locomotive class YCG-1
- Mumbai Suburban Railway

== Bibliography ==
- Haut, F.J.G (January 2000). The Pictorial History of Electric Locomotives. Oak Tree Publications. ISBN 9780498076442 – via Internet Archive.
- De Cet, Mirco; Kent, Alan (2006). The Complete Encyclopedia of Locomotives. Rebo International B.V. ISBN 9789036615051 – via Google Books.
