= Indian locomotive class WCP-3 =

GIPR EB/1 IR WCP-3
Type and origin
- Builder: R&W Hawthorn, Leslie & Co.; General Electric Company (GEC)
- Build date: 1928
- Total produced: 1
Specifications
- Configuration
  - UIC: 2′Co2′
- Gauge: 1,676 mm (5 ft 6 in)
- Electric system/s: 1500 V DC
- Transmission: Hohlwellen drive
Performance figures
- Maximum speed: 75 mph (120 km/h)
- Power output
  - 1 hour: 2,250 PS (1,655 kW; 2,219 hp)
  - Continuous: 2,130 PS (1,567 kW; 2,101 hp)
- Tractive effort
  - Starting: 24,055 lbf (107 kN)
Career
- Operators: Great Indian Peninsula Railway; Indian Railways
- Numbers: GIPR: 4001; IR: 20000

The Indian locomotive class WCP-3 was a single-member class of 1.5 kV DC electric locomotive that was developed in late 1920s by Hawthorn Leslie for Indian Railways. The model name stands for broad gauge (W), Direct Current (C), Passenger traffic (P) engine, 3rd generation (3). The locomotive was built at England between 1928 and 1929, and entering service in 1930.

The solitary WCP-3 served passenger trains for around 30 years, before being withdrawn in early 1960s, and was presumably scrapped.

== History ==
The electrification of the Great Indian Peninsular Railway (GIPR) began in 1922. Powerful locomotives were required to transport the express trains on the mountain railway to overcome the Western Ghats. They also had to be able to reach speeds of 85 miles an hour (137 km / h) - a very high speed at that time, which was not even the case with the E 501 and 502 of the Paris-Orleans Railway had been requested. Three test locomotives were therefore ordered from different manufacturers in order to be able to select a suitable design for the series. The tender and evaluation was monitored by the UK electrical engineering firm Merz & McLellan in London.

The Great Indian Peninsula Railway ordered the test locomotives in 1923:

- Number 4000, a 2'Bo(A1) locomotive with the Winterthur universal drive, built by SLM and Metropolitan Vickers and designated as EA/1. This design entered serial production, and would later become the WCP-1.
- Number 4001, a 2'Co2' Quill drive locomotive, built by Hawthorn Leslie and Company and General Electric Company and designated as EB/1, later known as the WCP-3.
- Number 4002, another Hawthorn Leslie 2'Co2', with the difference being that it had Buchli drive, and was jointly built by Brown Boveri. It was designated EC/1, later WCP-4.

== Specification ==
The locomotive has three individually driven axles and two two-axle bogies. The axes were driven by a hollow shaft drive from GEC. Technically, it should have some similarities with No. 13 of the North Eastern Railway (NER), otherwise little is known about this locomotive.

== See also ==
- Rail transport in India#History
- Indian Railways
- Locomotives of India
- Rail transport in India

== Bibliography ==
- Haut, F.J.G (January 2000). The Pictorial History of Electric Locomotives. Oak Tree Publications. ISBN 9780498076442 – via Internet Archive.
