= Java bogie =

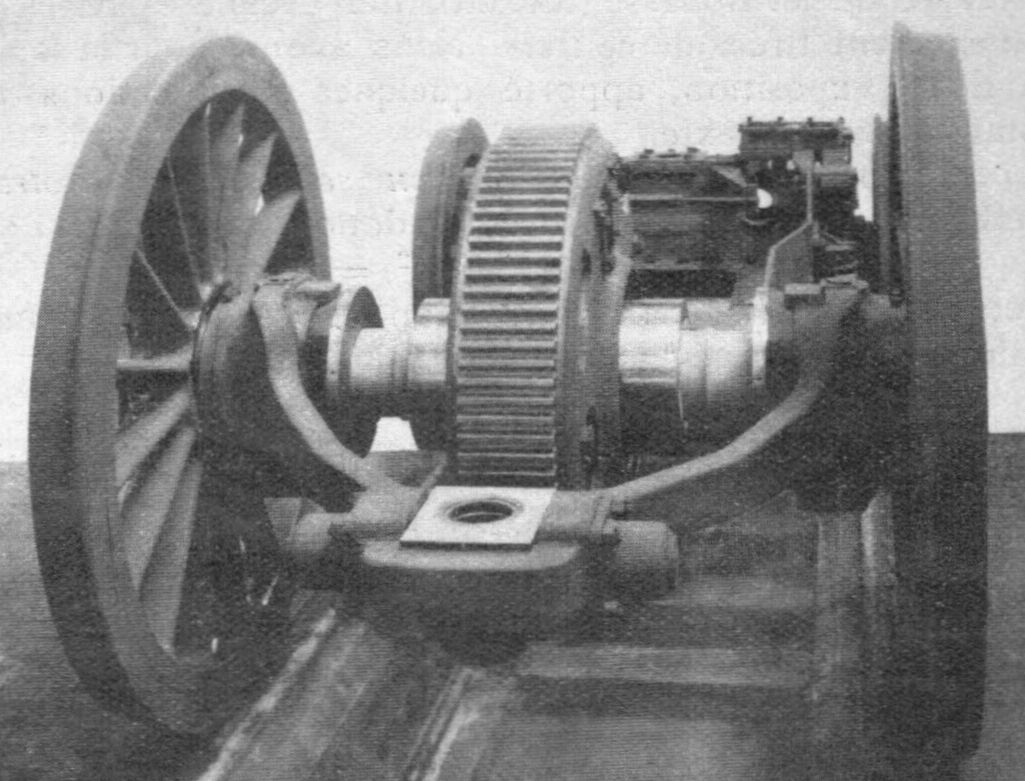
Java bogie, in front the drawbar with the swivel joint, on the drive axle (front axle) gear and coupling of an SLM universal drive

Running gear of a (1A) B (A1) locomotivewith Java bogies at the ends (outside carrying axles as Adams axles, inside driven axles) and transversely displaceable driven axles between the Java bogies, above: straight ahead; below: cornering

The Java bogie (German: Java-Drehgestell, Java-Gestell often in Swiss literature), was a bogie for electric locomotives manufactured by the Swiss Locomotive and Machine Works (SLM). It contained a driving wheel and a trailing wheel. It got its name because it was first installed in the 3000 series express train locomotives delivered to the Electrische Staats Spoorwegen (ESS) on Java in 1925.

== Technology ==
The planned increase in the maximum speeds on the electrified main lines in Switzerland beyond 100 km/h prompted the SLM designer Jakob Buchli to improve the cornering of the electric locomotives. The Krauss-Helmholtz bogie with its relatively light superstructure was not enough on the winding Swiss routes.

As a result of his investigations, the bogie, later called the Java bogie, was created. Its vertical axis of rotation was close to its driven axis, so that the conditions for radial adjustment in curves were optimal for it: the approach angle of the wheels against the rails was reduced. In order to be able to drive through even tighter curves without constraint, the running axis in the bogie that is further away from the axis of rotation was designed as an Adams axle. The guiding force on the outer rail shifted this axis obliquely inwards, the oblique part of the movement causing the axis to adjust radially.

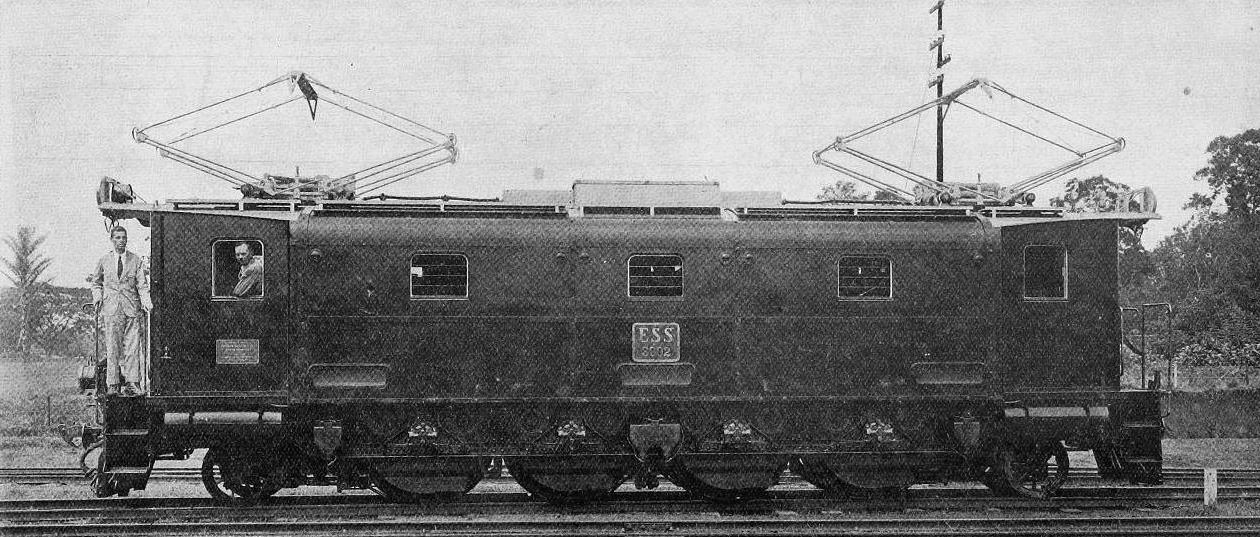
the Electrische Staats Spoorwegen (ESS) series 3000 on Java.

== Vehicles ==
SLM and BBC delivered two locomotives 7000–7001 to the Japanese State Railways in a very similar design and the same gauge as the Java locomotives.

The larger part of the SBB-CFF-FFS Ae 4/7 was also equipped with Java bogies, which gave them very good running properties. Because the maintenance of the Java bogies was more complex, they were replaced by Bissel axles from 1966 onwards.

The Java bogie was used again in the SBB-CFF-FFS Ae 8/14 double locomotives (1931/32, 1939), with the last one for the first time with pivot pins between the axles. The two outer drive axles and the adjacent running axle of the SBB Ae 4/6 10801-10806 (1941/42) were combined into a Java frame. With the SBB Ae 4/6 10807-10812 (1944/45) a further development of the Java frame was used, in which centering springs and a reset device were supposed to cause stable running on straight stretches and smooth cornering. The mechanical part of the Ae 4/6 was largely modeled on the NS Class 1000, which was delivered to Holland in 1948. The gas turbine locomotive SBB-CFF-FFS Am 4/6 1101, which was put into operation in 1941, had a similar arrangement of axles, which was converted from 1958–61 to Ae 4/6 ^{III} 10851.

Electric locomotive with the bogies with two driven axles was led by the construction of the BLS Ae 4/4 in 1944. The successors of this bogie locomotive broke after the Second World War, instead of rigid-framed electric locomotive. The Java bogie was no longer required as a result of the technical development of the electric locomotive's drive.

== See also ==
- Rigid-framed electric locomotive#(1A)Bo(A1) and the 'Java bogie'

== Literature ==
- "Neuerungen im mechanischen Aufbau elektrischer Schnellzuglokomotiven". Schweizerische Bauzeitung, Band 89 (1927), Heft 13. pp. 174–175. Archived from the original (PDF 1,5 MB) on 2016-04-02.
- K. Sachs. "Zur Entwicklung elektrischer Lokomotiven und Triebwagen in der Schweiz" (PDF 5,7 MB). Schweizerische Bauzeitung, Band 65 (1947), Heft 26. pp. 359–366.
- Hans Schneeberger: Die elektrischen und Dieseltriebfahrzeuge der SBB, Band I: Baujahre 1904-1955; Minirex AG, Luzern; 1995; ISBN 3-907014-07-3.
- SLM Winterthur (Hrsg.): Schweizerischer Lokomotivbau 1871 - 1971. Überblick über die von der Schweizerischen Lokomotiv- und Maschinenfabrik im vergangenen Jahrhundert gebauten Lokomotiven und Triebwagen. Winterthur, 1971
