= Winterthur universal drive =

Swiss electric locomotive drive

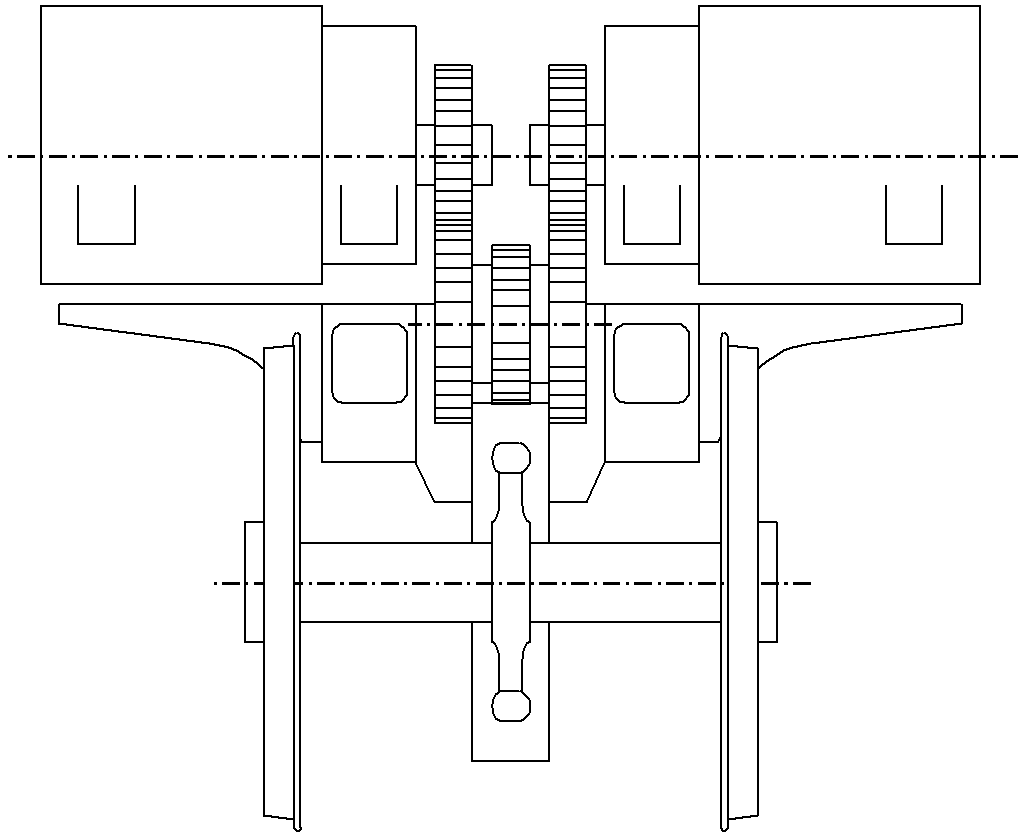
Winterthur Universal Drive with twin engines and double transmission

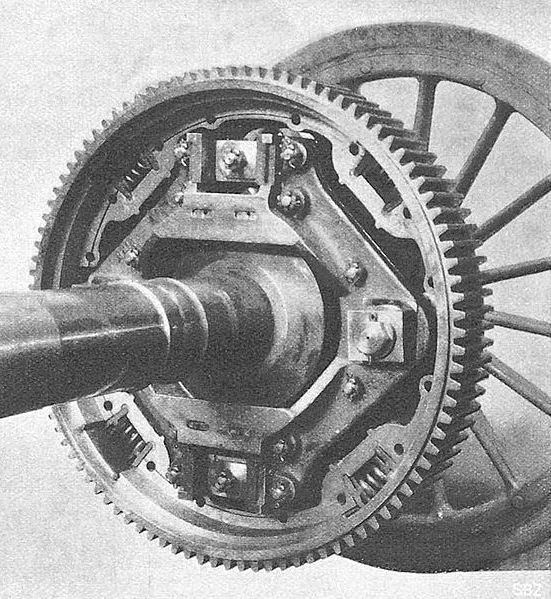
Drive wheel set with open cross coupling

The Winterthur universal drive or SLM universal drive (German: Universal-Antrieb Winterthur) was a drive for electric locomotives invented by Swiss engineer Jakob Buchli at Swiss Locomotive and Machine Works (SLM) in the 1920s.

== Design ==
After developing the successful Buchli drive at Brown, Boveri & Cie (BBC), Buchli moved to SLM at Winterthur in 1924, where he designed the universal drive. It was characterised by double gearbox, which enabled the transmission ratio to be selected freely within a wide range. Two coaxially opposed motors were arranged in the frame above each drive axle. The driving wheels were driven by a double gearbox, the second being connected centrally to the driving wheels by means of a universal joint.

== Service ==
The Winterthur universal drive was extensively used by SLM in locomotive designs from 1928 to 1948. It was compact and had a relatively light unsprung weight. However, it was difficult to access for maintenance and repair work, a particular problem as the gears were prone to wear. The drive was unpopular amongst drivers due to loud noise that it made, and production was discontinued when the design was rendered obsolete with the advent of lighter motors which enabled the modern axle-hung (also known as nose-suspended due to the "nose" that transfers weight and torque to the frame), direct-drive designs.

== Locomotives ==
Country	Operator	Class	Quantity produced	Years constructed	Manufacturer	Wheel arrangement	Image
India	GIPR	EA/1	22	1928–1930	SLM, Metrovick	2′Bo(A1)	
India	GIPR	EA/2	1	1938	SLM, Metrovick	2’Bo(A1)	
Switzerland	SBB-CFF-FFS	Ae 8/14 11851	1	1932	SLM, MFO	(1A)A1A(A1)+(1A)A1A(A1)	
Switzerland	SBB-CFF-FFS	Ae 8/14 11852	1	1938	SLM, BBC	(1A)A1A(A1)+(1A)A1A(A1)	
Switzerland	SBB-CFF-FFS	Ae 4/6	12	1941–1944	SLM, BBC, MFO, SAAS	(1A)Bo(A1)	
Netherlands	NS	1000	10	1948	SLM, Werkspoor	(1A)Bo(A1)	

== See also ==
- Quill drive
- Tschanz drive
