= NS Class 1000 =

Class of Dutch electric locomotives

NS 1000
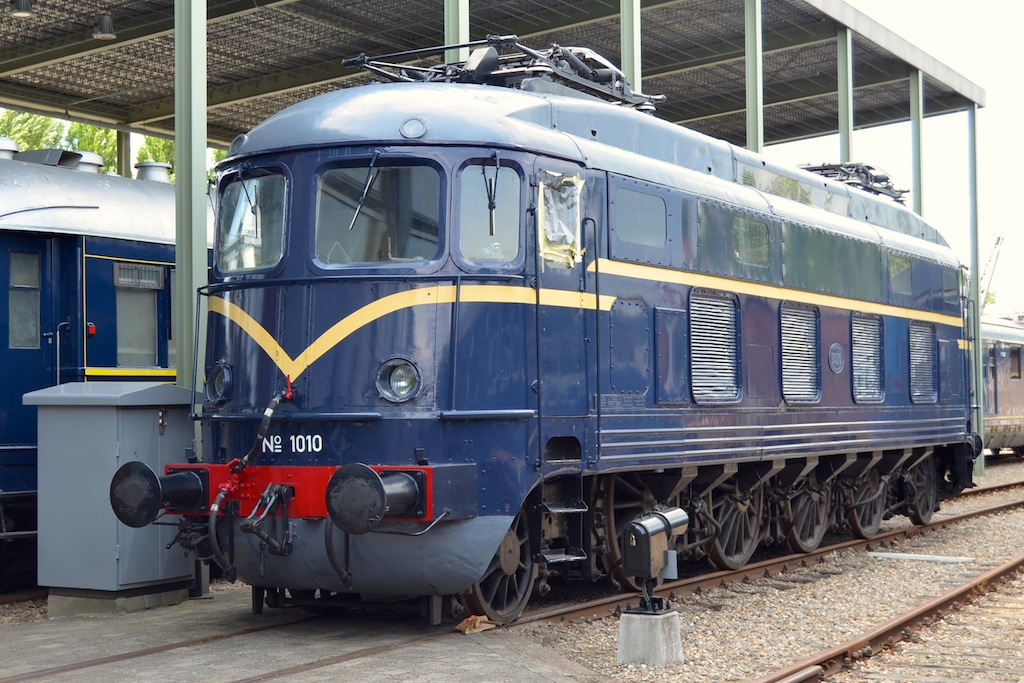
- NS 1010 at the Dutch railway museum in Utrecht
Type and origin
- Power type: Electric
- Builder: Swiss Locomotive and Machine Works (SLM) 1001-1003, Werkspoor 1004-1010
- Build date: 1947-1948 SLM, 1948-1949 Werkspoor
- Total produced: 10
Specifications
- Configuration
  - UIC: (1A)Bo(A1)
- Gauge: 1,435 mm (4 ft 8 1/2 in)
- Wheel diameter: 1.55 m (61.0 in)
- Trailing dia.: 1.1 m (43.3 in)
- Minimum curve: 140 m (459 ft 3.8 in)
- Length
  - Over couplers: 16.220 m (53.2 ft)
- Adhesive weight: 72 t (70.9 long tons; 79.4 short tons)
- Loco weight: 100 t (98.4 long tons; 110.2 short tons)
- Electric system/s: 1.500 V DC Catenary
- Current pickup: Pantograph
- Traction motors: 8
- Transmission: SLM-Universalantrieb
- Gear ratio: 1:3.56
- Train brakes: Air
Performance figures
- Maximum speed: 160 km/h (99 mph), 100 km/h (62 mph) limited maximum
- Power output
  - 1 hour: 3,296 kW (4,420 hp)
  - Continuous: 2,796 kW (3,749 hp)
- Tractive effort: 177 kN (39,791.2 lb_{f})
Career
- Operators: Nederlandse Spoorwegen
- Class: NS 1000
- Numbers: 1001-1010
- Retired: 1982
- Disposition: 1010 preserved, remainder scrapped

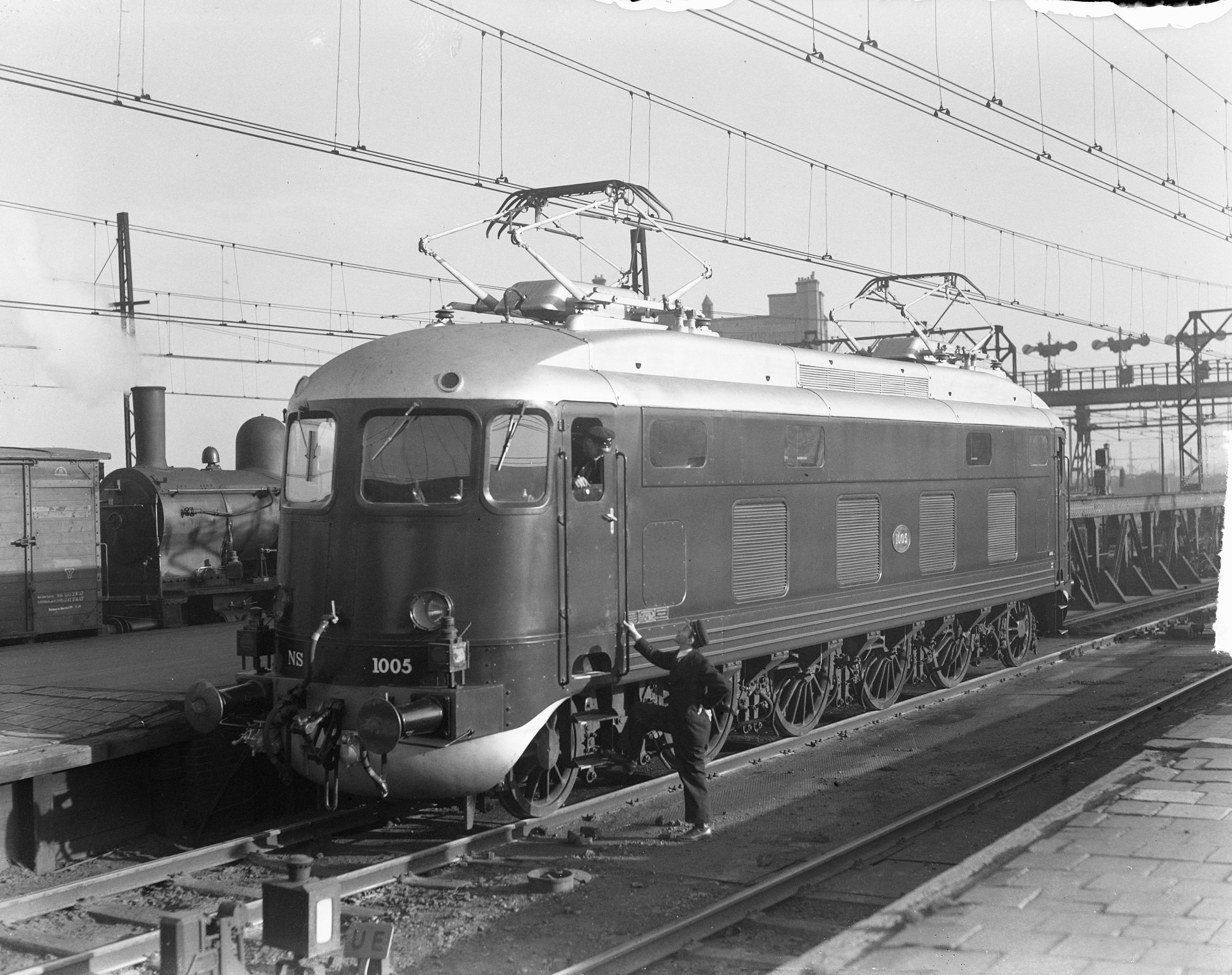
NS 1005 at Amsterdam Centraal station in 1948

The Nederlandse Spoorwegen (NS) Class 1000 was a set of ten electric locomotives (numbered 1001-1010) used in the Netherlands during the latter half of the 20th century. The electrical systems and three completed units were ordered from the Swiss Locomotive and Machine Works in 1942, but the war blocked delivery until 1948. Despite high failure rates the locomotives remained in service until 1982, and locomotive 1010—built by Werkspoor—is now preserved in the Dutch National Railway Museum.

== Background ==
In 1908 the first electric train in the Netherlands ran from Rotterdam to The Hague (Den Haag) and Scheveningen. It was electrified with a 10,000 volt 25 Hz AC power supply.

After World War I the Dutch government decided to install a committee to investigate electrification of the Dutch State Railways, Nederlandse Spoorwegen, formed in 1917 but officially only established in 1937. For that, the committee members traveled the world to visit existing electrified railways. In the early 1920s they came to the conclusion that a 1500 volt DC system would be the best choice.

Most Dutch electrified rolling stock were EMU's. During World War II, the German occupiers used these EMU sets to haul heavy freight trains for their war effort.

== History ==
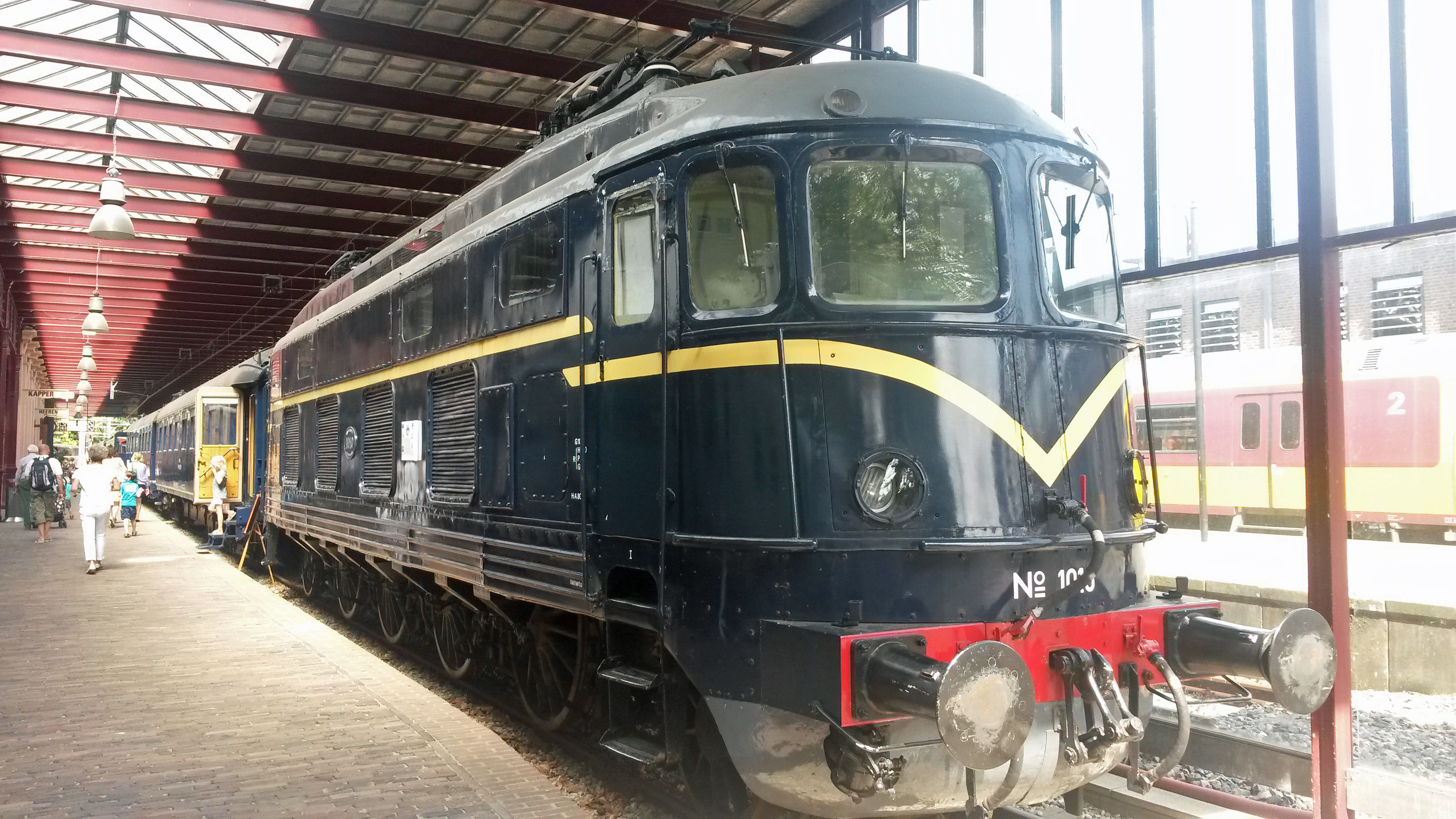
Preserved at the Railway Museum in Utrecht

NS management already had contact with the Swiss company Oerlikon about ordering a series of electric locos before the war. They were to be based on the Swiss Ae 4/6 type. In 1942 the series was ordered, but the war prevented delivery until 1948. The order was subsequently changed to suit Dutch needs.

The "Schweizerische Lokomotivenfabrik Winterthur" (SLM) would build 3 complete locos and deliver the electrical equipment for the remaining 7. These 7 would be built in the Netherlands, by Werkspoor.

The series would be numbered 1001-1010 and had 6 axles in a 2-2+2+2+2-2 or (1A)Bo(A1) configuration. The arrangement was similar to the widely used 1′Do1′ arrangement of this period, but with the outer driven axles articulated as a bogie with the unpowered carrying axles, rather than the carrying axles being articulated as single axle pony or Bissel trucks. This configuration was already used successfully on the electrified railway network on Java, then a Dutch colony, but in the Netherlands it was a failure due to its complicated technology and high maintenance.
