= Indian locomotive class YCG-1 =

Class of 4 Indian metre-gauge 1.5 kV DC electric locomotives

Indian locomotive class YCG-1 SIR class EG
- YCG-1 21900 (ex-SIR EG1) preserved at the National Rail Museum, New Delhi
Type and origin
- Power type: Electric
- Designer: English Electric
- Builder: English Electric; Hawthorn Leslie
- Build date: 1930
- Total produced: 4
Specifications
- Configuration
  - AAR: B-B
  - UIC: Bo′Bo′
  - Commonwealth: Bo-Bo
- Gauge: 1,000 mm (3 ft 3 3/8 in)
- Length: 32 ft (9.8 m)
- Width: 8 ft 6 in (2.59 m)
- Loco weight: 43 t (42 long tons; 47 short tons)
- Electric system/s: 1.5 kV DC Overhead
- Current pickup(s): Pantograph
- Traction motors: Two nose-suspended 160 hp (120 kW), one per bogie
- MU working: Not possible
Performance figures
- Maximum speed: 65 km/h (40 mph)
- Power output: 640 hp (480 kW)
Career
- Operators: South Indian Railway (SIR); Indian Railways (IR)
- Class: EG (SIR); YCG-1 (IR)
- Numbers: 1–4 (SIR) 21900–21903 (All-India)
- Locale: Chennai
- Delivered: 1930
- Withdrawn: 1965
- Preserved: 1
- Current owner: National Rail Museum
- Disposition: One preserved, remainder scrapped

The YCG-1 was a class of electric locomotives built in the 1930s for use on the metre-gauge electrified lines in the Chennai area. Its class designation denotes a metre-gauge (Y) DC current (C) goods locomotive (G). With the conversion of the lines to 25 kv AC, all were withdrawn. One is preserved at National Rail Museum in New Delhi.

== History ==
Four of these locomotives, designated class EG, were supplied by English Electric in 1930 for goods traffic on the South Indian Railway's Madras to Tambaram suburban line recently electrified at 1.5 kV DC overhead, and were later withdrawn when the succeeding Southern Railway switched to AC traction. One locomotive, no. 21900 (ex-SIR no. EG1) is now preserved at the NRM.

== Design ==
The YCG-1 were able to run on unelectrified lines by operating with ET class 4-wheeled 440 volt battery tenders, of which two were built, containing a capacity of 158 kWh (570 MJ) and a load of 21 LT (21 t). A link mechanism between the two bogies allowed the locomotive to navigate curves easier. The pantographs were of the diamond pattern.

== See also ==
- Chennai Suburban Railway
- Indian locomotive class WCG-1
- Indian locomotive class YAM-1

== Bibliography ==
- Hughes, Hugh (1992). Indian Locomotives: Part 2 – Metre Gauge 1872–1940. Harrow, Middlesex: The Continental Railway Circle. ISBN 0-9503469-9-3. OCLC 26549293.
- Hughes, Hugh (1996). Indian Locomotives: Part 4 – 1941–1990. Harrow, Middlesex: The Continental Railway Circle. ISBN 0-9521655-1-1. OCLC 35135033.
- Haut, F.J.G (January 2000). The Pictorial History of Electric Locomotives. Oak Tree Publications. ISBN 9780498076442 – via Internet Archive.
