= Jakob Buchli =

Swiss engineer

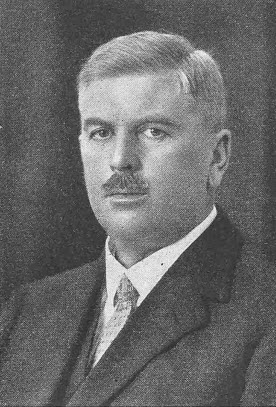
Jakob Buchli

Jakob Buchli (4 March 1876 – 1 April 1945) was a Swiss design engineer in the field of locomotive construction.

== Life ==
Jakob Buchli was born in Chur, Switzerland, on 4 March 1876. After his training to be an engineer he worked from 1902 to 1910 for the Swiss Locomotive and Machine Works (Schweizerische Lokomotiv- und Maschinenfabrik or SLM) in Winterthur; from 1907 as its head of the design office. After that he switched to Brown, Boveri & Cie. in Baden, Switzerland, where he was the chief engineer for electric traction until 1924. From 1924 to 1930 he was technical director of the locomotive construction department of the SLM.

Amongst his most important designs were the Buchli drive (1918) named after him and used on the SBB Class Ae 4/7 amongst others, the Java bogie, the Winterthur universal drive and the duplex bogie for express coaches.

He died in Winterthur on 1 April 1945.

== See also ==
- List of railway pioneers

== Sources ==
- "Jakob Buchli (Nachruf)". pp. 246–247. Archived from the original on 2016-04-02.
- Buchli, Jakob in German, French and Italian in the online Historical Dictionary of Switzerland.
