= Indian locomotive class WCP-4 =

GIPR EC/1 IR WCP-4
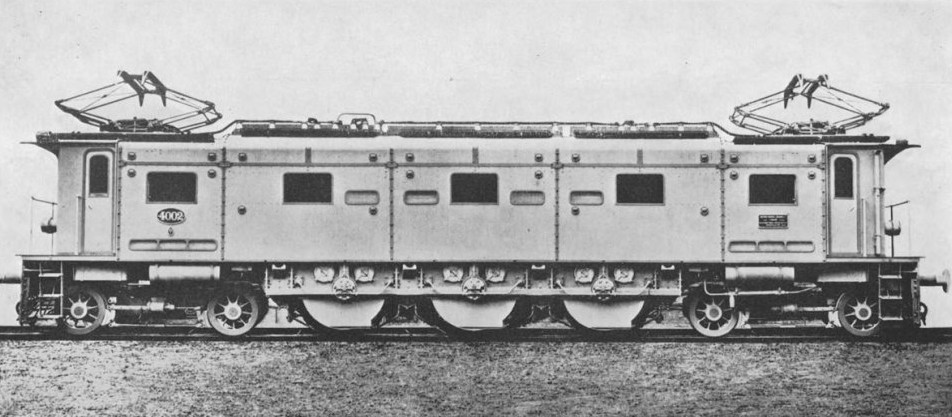
Type and origin
- Builder: Hawthorn Leslie and Company; Brown, Boveri & Cie.
- Build date: 1928
- Total produced: 1
Specifications
- Configuration
  - UIC: 2′Co2′
- Electric system/s: 1500 V DC
- Traction motors: Three
- Transmission: Buchli drive
Performance figures
- Maximum speed: 75 mph (121 km/h)
- Power output
  - 1 hour: 2,390 PS (1,760 kW; 2,360 hp)
- Tractive effort
  - Starting: 111 kN (24,950 lbf)
Career
- Operators: Great Indian Peninsula Railway; Indian Railways
- Numbers: GIPR 4001; IR 20001

The Indian locomotive class WCP-4 was a single-member class of 1.5 kV DC electric locomotive that was developed in late 1920s by Swiss Locomotive and Machine Works (SLM) for Indian Railways. The model name stands for broad gauge (W), Direct Current (C), Passenger traffic (P) engine, 4th generation (4). The locomotive was built at England between 1928 and 1929, and entering service in 1930.

The solitary WCP-4 served passenger trains for around 30 years before being withdrawn in early 1960s, and was presumably scrapped.

This was also the last locomotive built for dedicated passenger service (P at end) until WAP-1, 50 years later.

== History ==
Electrification of the Great Indian Peninsula Railway began in 1922. Powerful locomotives were required to transport the express trains on the mountain railway to overcome the Western Ghats. They also had to be able to reach speeds of 85 miles an hour (137 km/h). In 1923, three test locomotives were ordered from different manufacturers in order to be able to select a suitable design for the series. The tender and evaluation was monitored by the English electrical engineering firm Merz & McLellan in London. The EA/1 emerged as the best locomotive from the evaluation, so that 21 more vehicles of this type were ordered, thus leaving the other two designs remaining as one-offs. The locomotive is believed to have been scrapped in the 1960s.

== See also ==
- Rail transport in India#History
- Indian Railways
- Locomotives of India
- Rail transport in India

== Bibliography ==
- Haut, F.J.G (January 2000). The Pictorial History of Electric Locomotives. Oak Tree Publications. ISBN 9780498076442 – via Internet Archive.
