= Swiss Locomotive and Machine Works =

Swiss railway equipment manufacturer

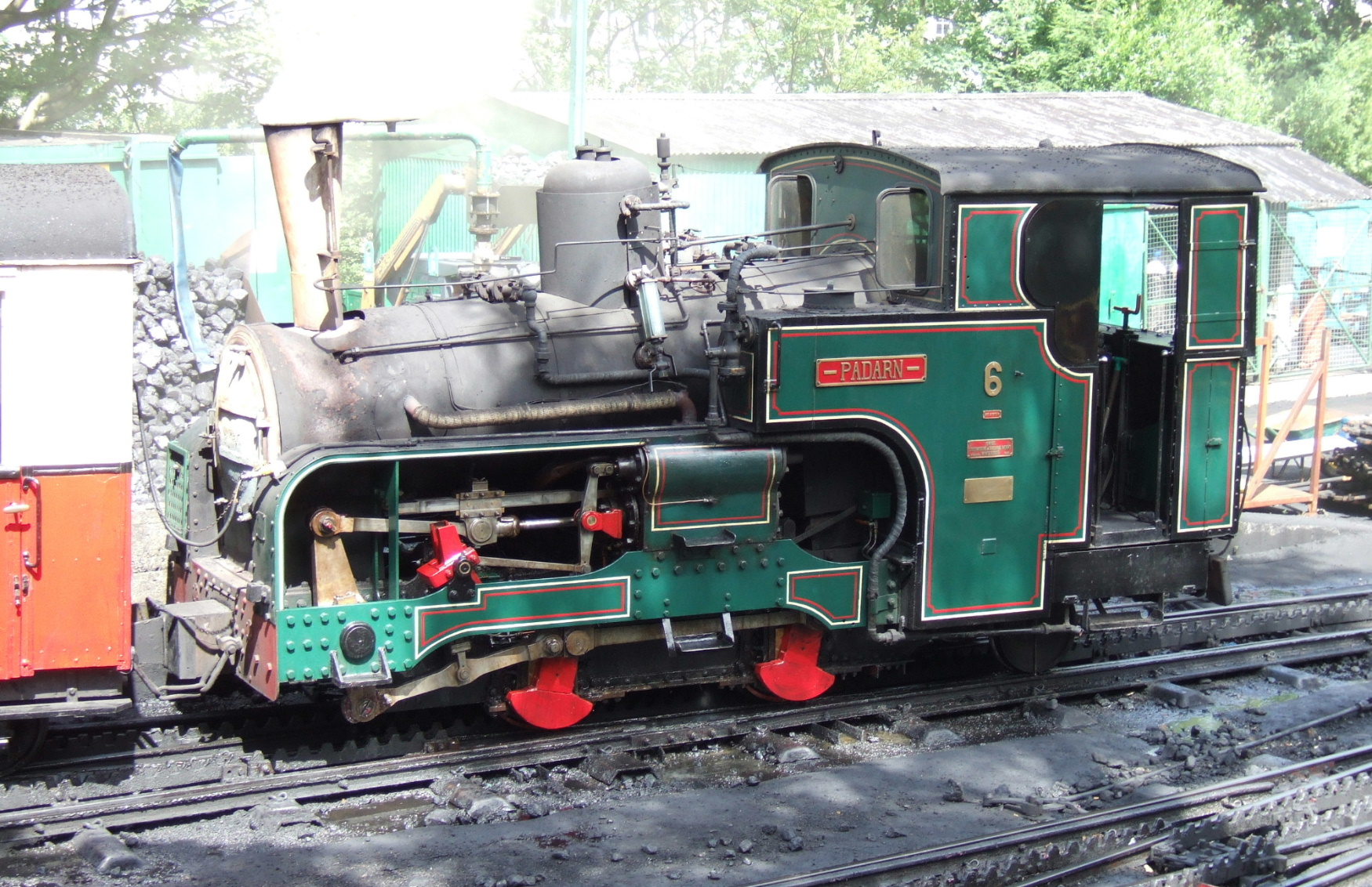
- SLM is best known for mountain railway equipment
- Type: Subsidiary
- Industry: Rail transport
- Founded: 1871; 155 years ago
- Defunct: 2005
- Successor: Stadler Rail
- Headquarters: Winterthur, Switzerland
- Area served: Worldwide
- Products: Electric locomotives; Steam locomotives; Railcars

Swiss Locomotive and Machine Works (German Schweizerische Lokomotiv- und Maschinenfabrik; French Société Suisse pour la Construction de Locomotives et de Machines; or for both, SLM) was a railway equipment manufacturer based in Winterthur in Switzerland. Much of the world's mountain railway equipment was constructed by the company.

== History ==
The company was founded in 1871 by the British engineer Charles Brown. SLM built both steam and electric locomotives, including the crocodile type.

From 1992, SLM returned to producing steam locomotives designed around advanced steam technology principles. This included rebuilding DR Class 52.80 locomotive number 52 8055.

In 1998, the cog-railway division was sold to Stadler Rail, and the engineering division, via Adtranz, to Bombardier Transportation. The remaining business was renamed Sulzer-Winpro AG and as part of a management buyout in 2001, was renamed Winpro AG.

The advanced steam division was sold in 2000 to Dampflokomotiv- und Maschinenfabrik AG (Steam Locomotive and Machine Works Ltd), or DLM AG.

In October 2001, the measurement division was sold to PROSE AG.

Winpro AG was sold on 7 September 2005 to Stadler Rail.

== Tractor ==
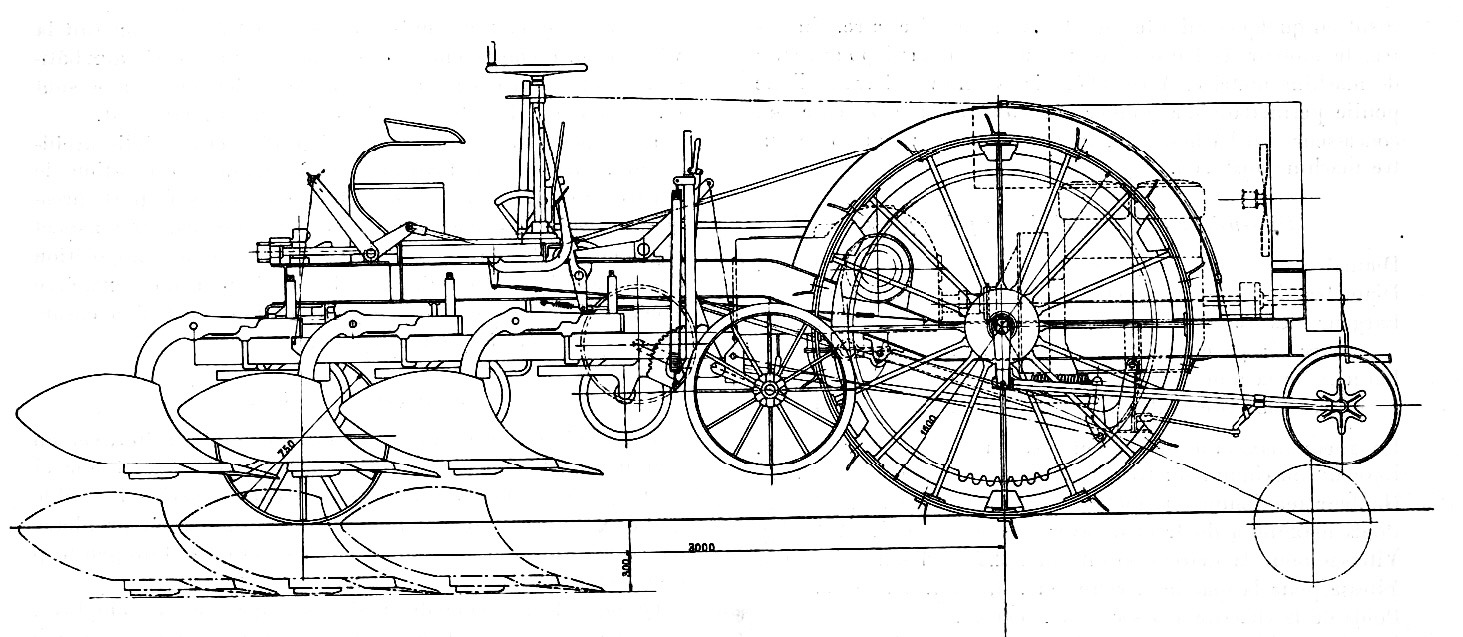
Swiss Locomotive and Machine Works tractor 30 hp (1919) side view

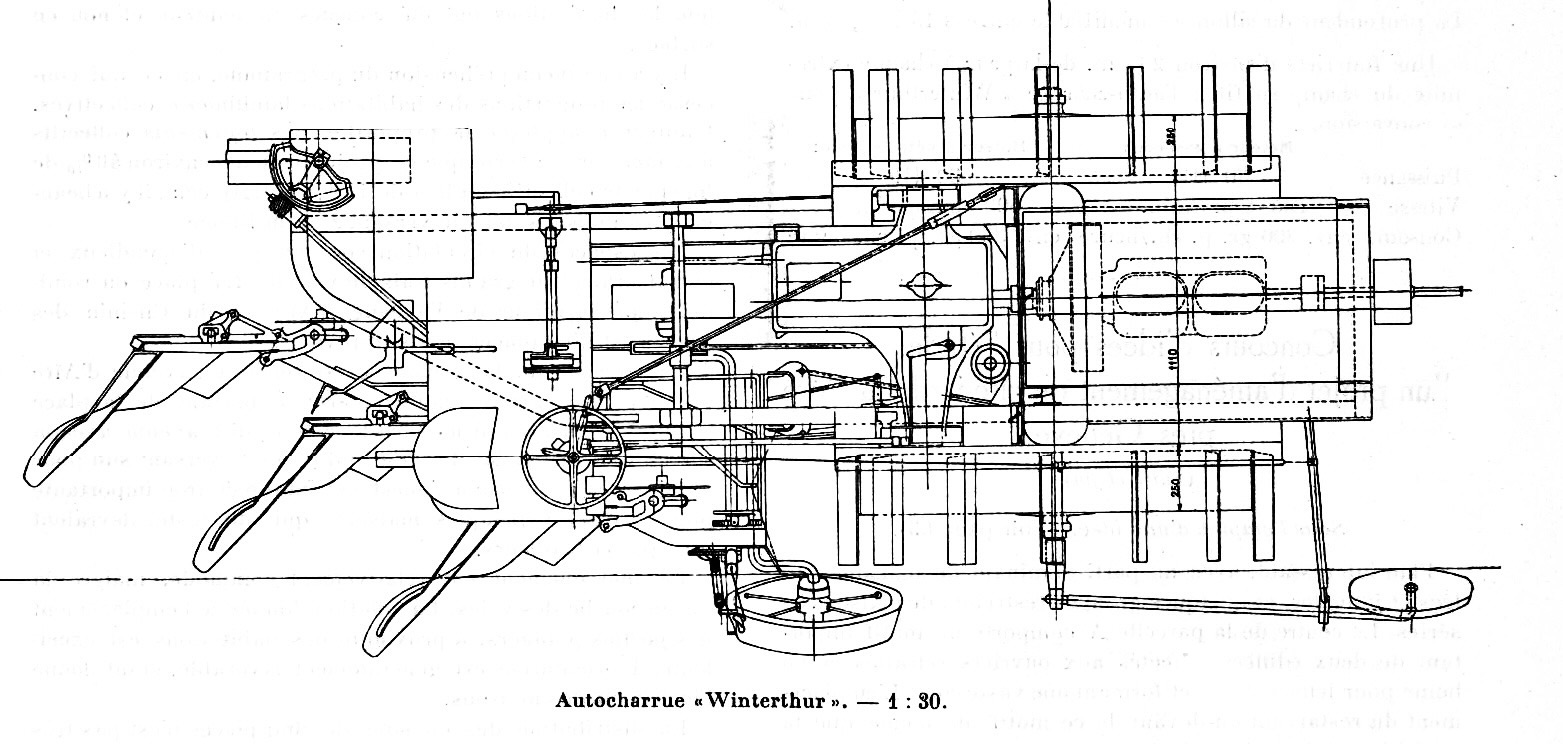
Swiss Locomotive and Machine Works tractor 30 hp (1919) top view

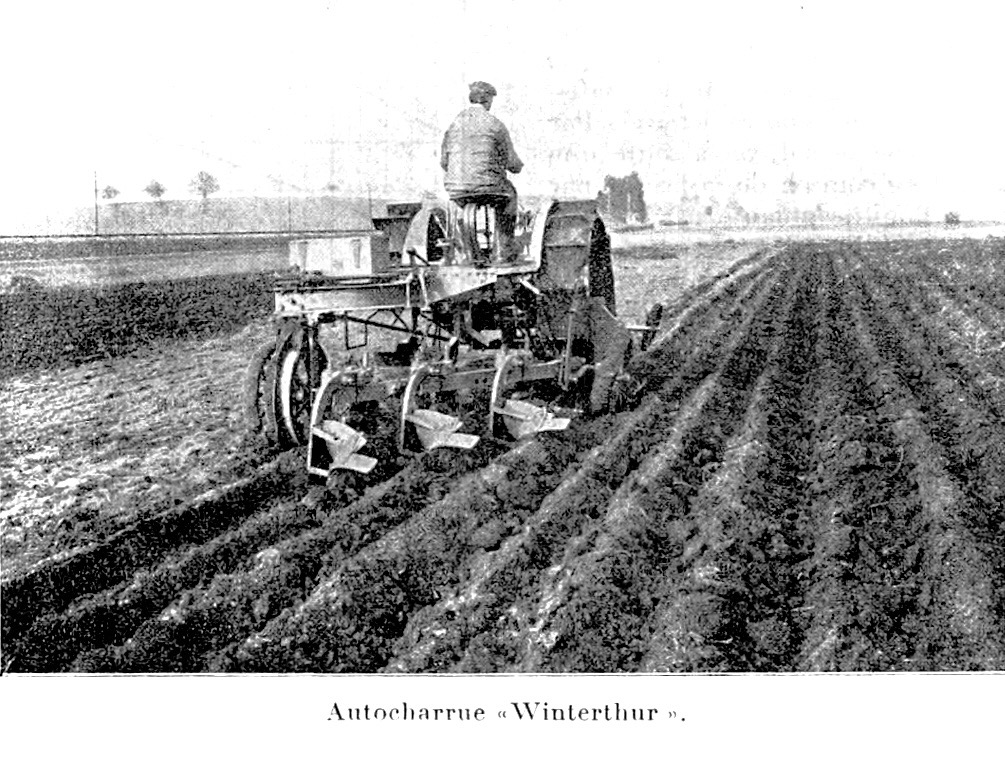
Swiss Locomotives and Machine Works tractor 30 hp Winterthur (1919)

In 1919, SLM developed a tractor to create a new area of business. The tractor had an engine power of 30 hp. The vehicle was 5,500 mm long and 2,100 mm wide. The wheelbase was 3000 mm. The total weight was 2,800 kg. The top speed was 6 km/h. The drive wheels on the front axle had a diameter of 1600 mm. The rear wheel had a diameter of 750 mm.

== Preserved SLM Locomotives ==
=== Finland ===
Image	Class	Built	Number	Type	SLM Number	Wheel arrangement	Location	Notes
	Sk1	1885	124	Mixed traffic steam locomotive	405	2-6-0	Finnish Railway Museum	
	F1	1886	132	Passenger steam locomotive	434	0-4-4T	Finnish Railway Museum	“Felix”

=== France ===
Image	Class	Built	Number	Type	SLM Number	Wheel arrangement	Location	Notes
		1923	6	Mountain railway rack steam locomotive		2-4-2T	Chamonix	Last of 6 built for Chemin de fer du Montenvers
		1909	3 Mlle d'Angeville	Mountain railway rack steam locomotive	1990	0-4-0T	Saint-Gervais-les-Bains	One of five built for the Mont Blanc Tramway
		1909	4 Jules Jansen	Mountain railway rack steam locomotive	1991	0-4-0T	Saint-Gervais-les-Bains	One of five built for the Mont Blanc Tramway

=== India ===
Image	Class	Built	Number	Type	SLM Number	Wheel arrangement	Location	Notes
	X	1914–1952	37384; 37385; 37389,90; 37391,92,93,95	Rack-and-adhesion steam locomotive	2456; 2734; 3000–3001; 4069,70,71,73	Db1' h4vt	Dehli, Coonoor, Chennai, Trichy	17 built by SLM, gauge 1000 mm, 3 still in service, 5 preserved
	WCG1 khekda (crab)	1928	4502, Sir Leslie Wilson	1,500 V DC, 650 hp Electric goods locomotive		C-C	National Rail Museum, New Delhi	10 built by SLM; 31 similar built by Vulcan Foundry

=== Indonesia ===
Image	Class	Built	Number	Type	SLM Number	Wheel arrangement	Location	Notes
	SLM HGm4/6 (PJKA Class BB204)	1993	BB204 15; BB204 16	Diesel Electric rack locomotive	5631-5632	Bo-2-Bo	Solok depot, West Sumatra	Stored at Solok depot
	SS 1600 (DKA CC50)	1928	CC50 29 (SS 1629)	Articulated mallet locomotive	3253	2-6-6-0	Ambarawa Railway Museum, Central Java	16 built by SLM, 14 similar built by Werkspoor
	SS 1100 (DKA C27)	1916	C27 10 (SS 1110)	Baltic express locomotive	2584	4-6-4T	Transportation Museum of Taman Mini Indonesia Indah, Jakarta	29 delivered between 1916 and 1922, built by SLM, Armstrong Whitworth and Werkspoor.
	SS 3100 (SLM BBC 3)	1924	SS 3100 (SLM BBC 3)	Baltic express locomotive	2584	2-8-2T	Transportation Museum of Taman Mini Indonesia Indah, Jakarta	29 delivered between 1916 and 1922, built by SLM, Armstrong Whitworth and Werkspoor.

=== Switzerland ===
Image	Class	Built	Number	Type	SLM Number	Wheel arrangement	Location	Notes
	G 3/3	1902; 1912	5; 6	Narrow gauge steam locomotive	1440; 2276	0-6-0T	Waldenburg railway Swiss Museum of Transport	5 built for the Waldenburg railway; gauge 750 mm (2 ft 5 1/2 in); G 3/3 5 named Gedeon Thommen; G 3/3 6 named Waldenburg
	HG 4/4	1924; 1930	704; 708	Rack-and-adhesion steam locomotive	2940; 3413	Dd h4vt	Realp on the Furka Steam Railway	7 built by SLM, 2 by Esslingen, gauge 1000 mm, for Vietnam, 2 brought back to Switzerland and remanufactured, in service
	Ge 6/6	1912-1929	402, 406, 407, 411, 414, 415	Narrow gauge electric locomotive		C-C	Various locations	15 built for Rhaetian Railway; gauge 1,000 mm (3 ft 3 3/8 in), 2 still in service

=== United Kingdom ===
Image	Class	Built	Number	Type	SLM Number	Wheel arrangement	Location	Notes
		1895	2 Enid	Mountain railway rack steam locomotive	924	0-4-2RT	Snowdon Mountain Railway	
		1895	3 Wyddfa	Mountain railway rack steam locomotive	925	0-4-2RT	Snowdon Mountain Railway	
		1896	4 Snowdon	Mountain railway rack steam locomotive	988	0-4-2RT	Snowdon Mountain Railway	
		1896	5 Moel Siabod	Mountain railway rack steam locomotive	989	0-4-2RT	Snowdon Mountain Railway	
		1922	6 Padarn	Mountain railway rack steam locomotive	2838	0-4-2RT	Snowdon Mountain Railway	
		1923	7 Ralph Sadler	Mountain railway rack steam locomotive	2869	0-4-2RT	Snowdon Mountain Railway	
		1923	8 Eryri	Mountain railway rack steam locomotive	2870	0-4-2RT	Snowdon Mountain Railway	

== See also ==
- SLM factories
- Jakob Buchli - a railway pioneer with the SLM

== Gallery ==
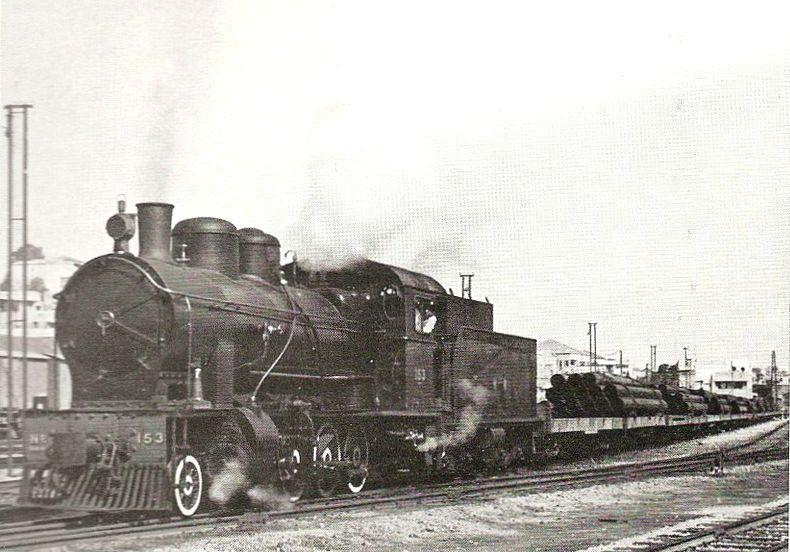
SLM built this 1050mm gauge 2-8-0 for the Hejaz Railway in 1912 and it was still at work on Palestine Railways in 1946.

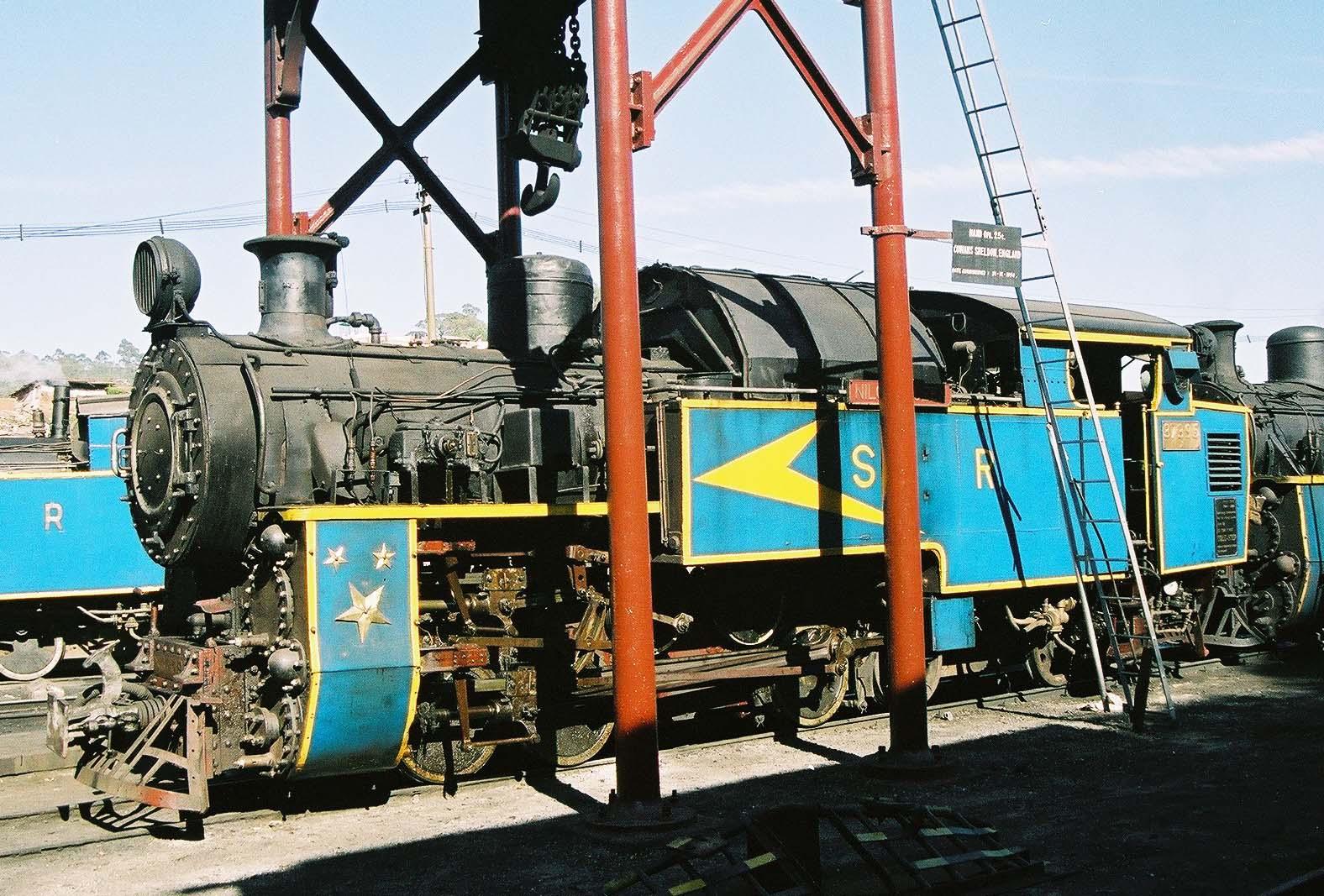
SLM locomotives are still at work in India on some heritage railways.

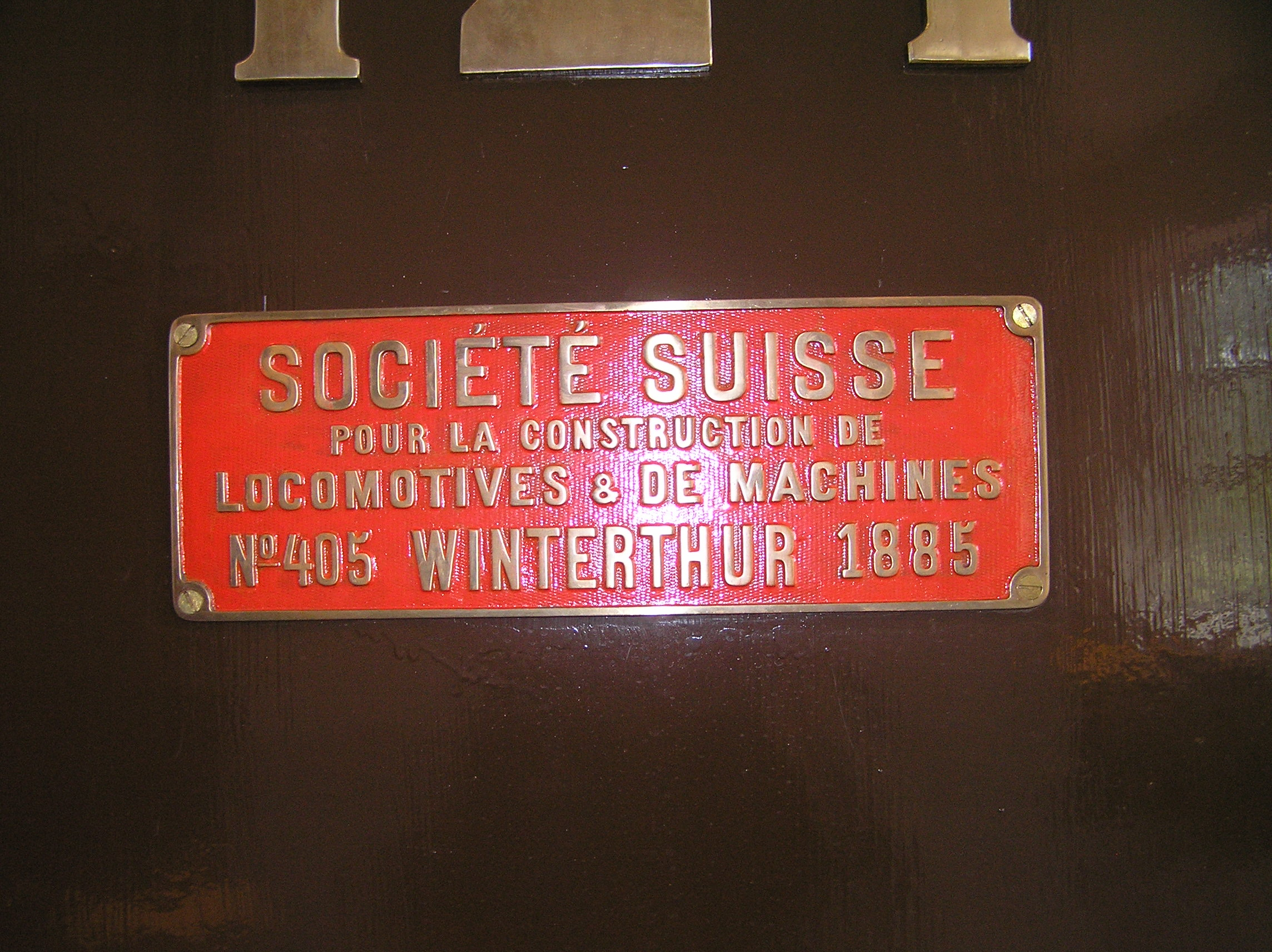
Builder's Plate 2-6-0 Swiss Locomotive and Machine Works Societe Suisse Locomotive No 405 from 1885 at the Finnish Railway Museum

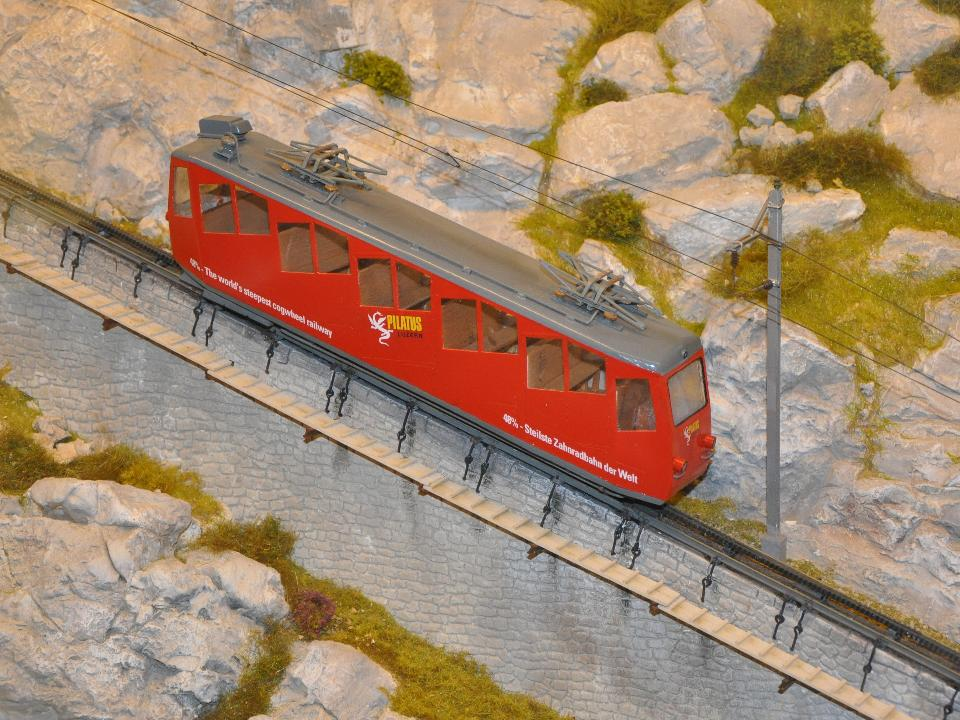
Electric railcars built by SLM are used in the Pilatus Railway

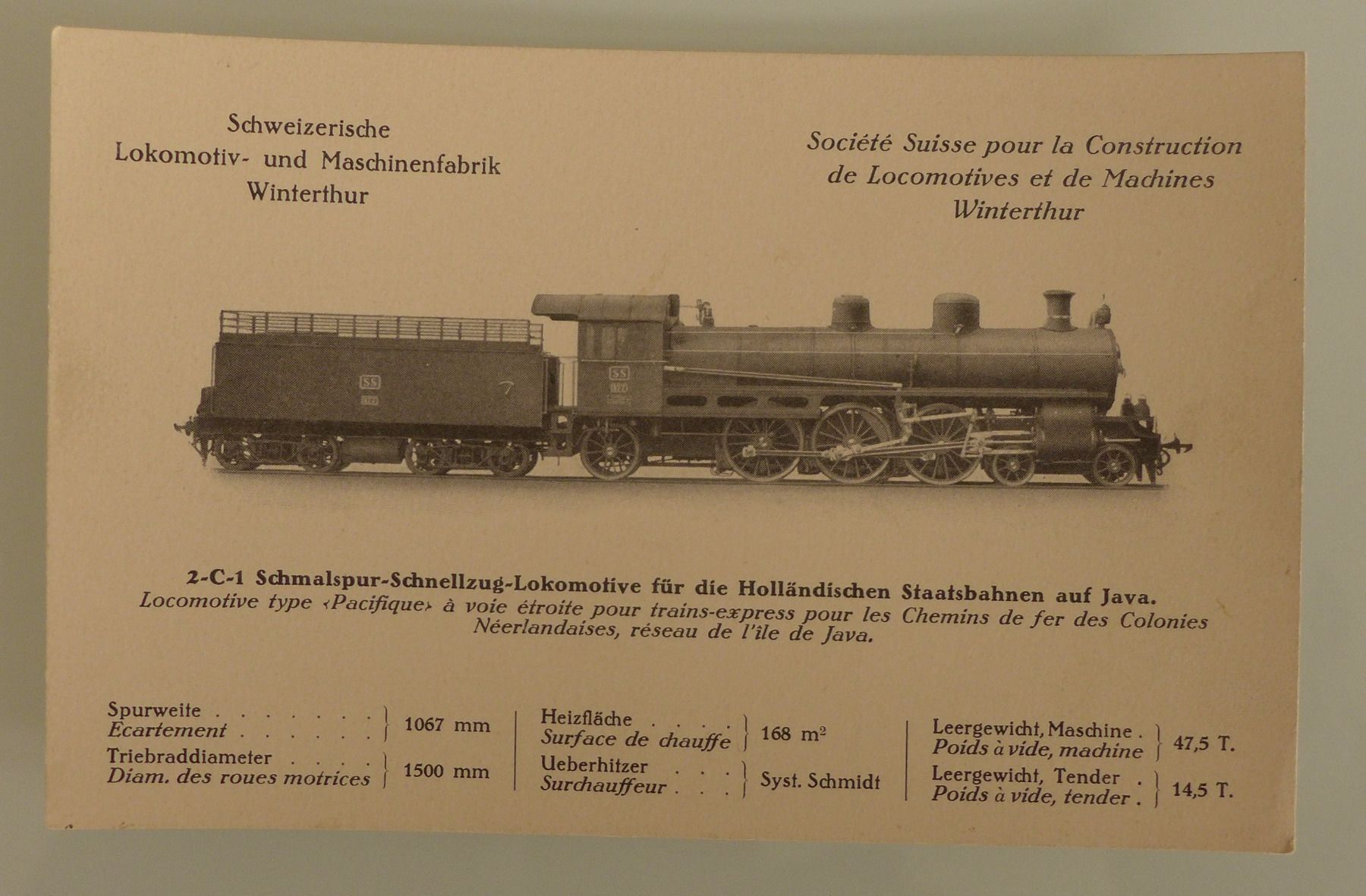
The express engines 4-6-2 SS Class 700 or PNKA C50 which were ordered by Staatsspoorwegen from SLM and Hartmann for line in Java, came in 1911-1914

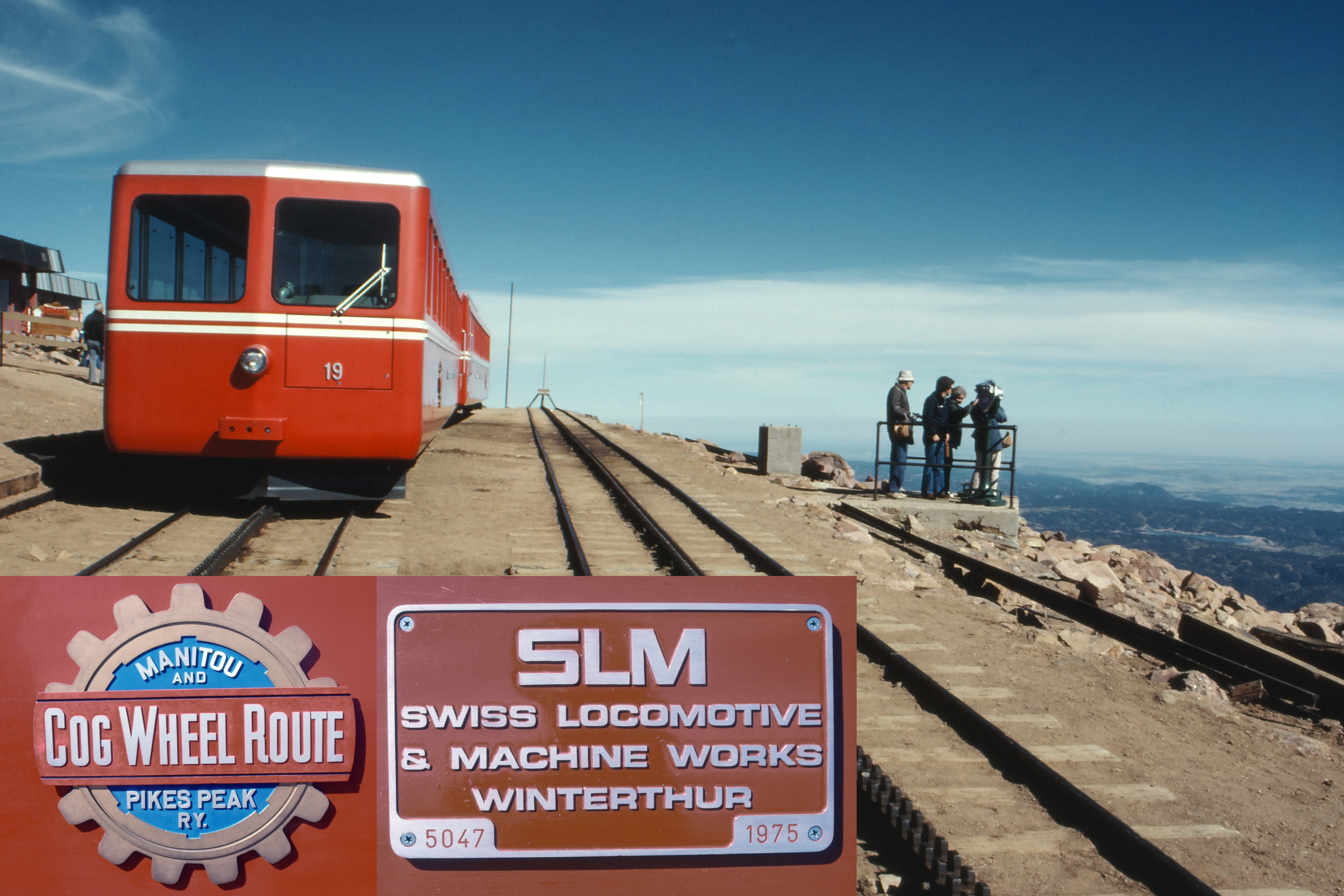
Diesel hydraulic railcar on Manitou and Pike's Peak Railway, Colorado, USA

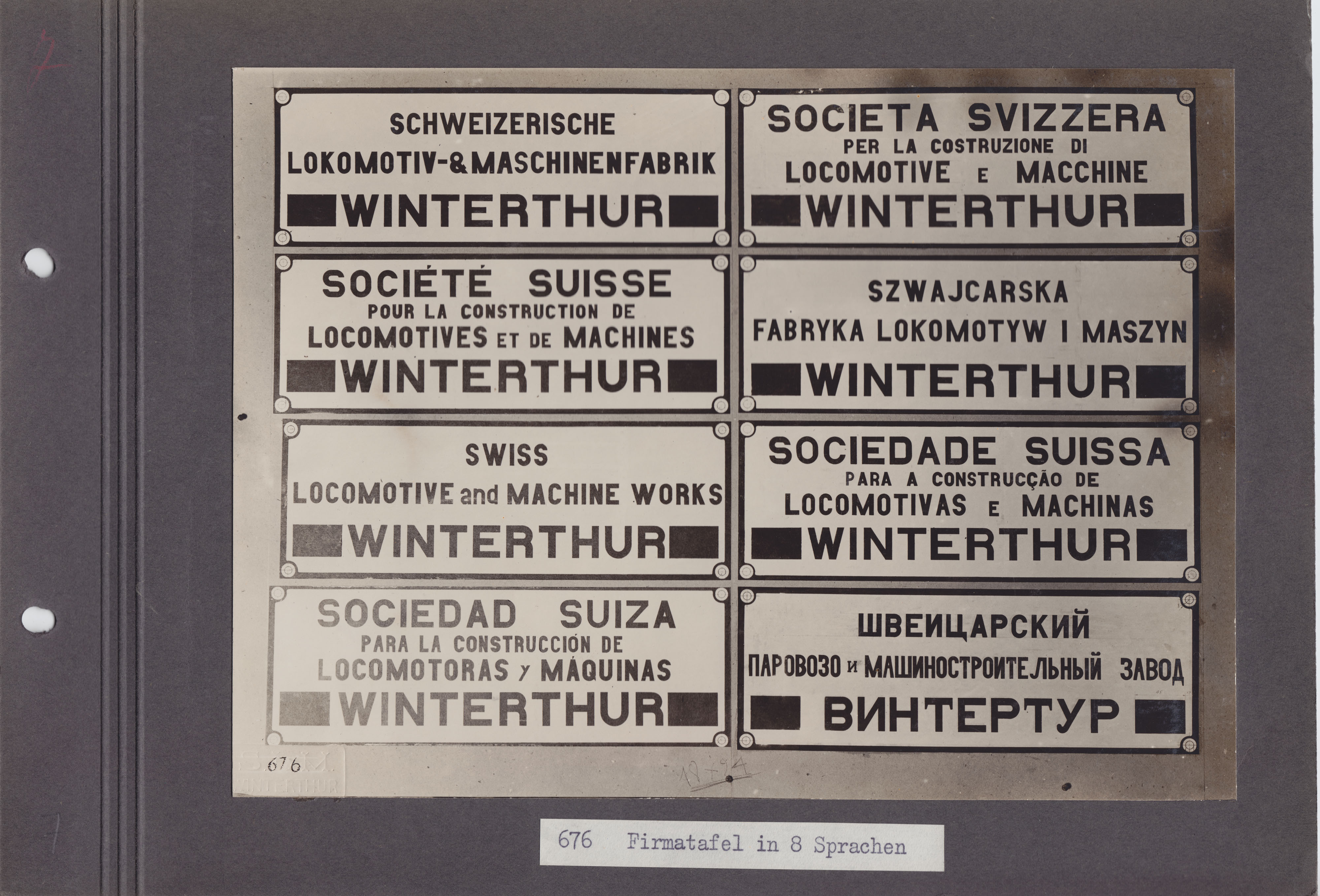
SLM works plates in 8 different languages
