= Bridle (disambiguation) =

Bridle usually refers to headgear worn by horses and other animals that are ridden or driven.

Bridle may also refer to:

== Items ==
- A part of a kite
- A line or strip of webbing connecting a pilot chute to the canopy of a parachute
- Scold's bridle, a 16th-century instrument of punishment or torture

== People ==
- Adam Bridle, South African professional wrestler better known as Angélico
- Augustus Bridle (1868–1952), Canadian journalist and author
- Chris Bridle, president of Orthodontic Technicians Association
- James Bridle (born 1980), British visual artist and writer
- Kathleen Bridle (1897–1989), British artist and teacher
- Nicholas Bridle, American politician
- Paul Augustus Bridle (1914–1988), Canadian diplomat
- Sarah Bridle, British professor of astronomy

== See also ==
- Bridle path (disambiguation)
- Bridel (disambiguation)
