= SBB Ae 4/8 =

Swiss electric prototype locomotive

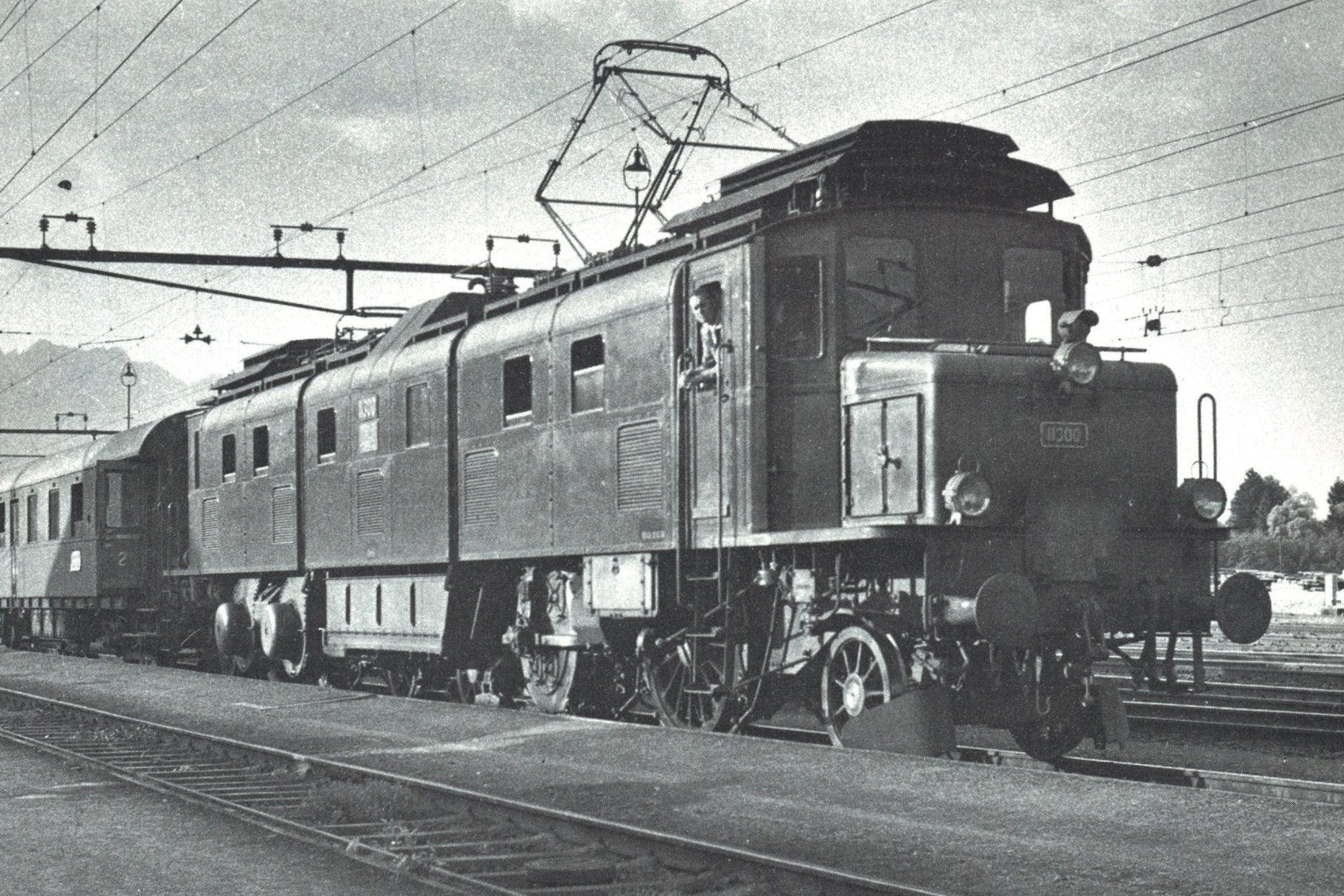
- In 1922
Type and origin
- Power type: Electric
- Builder: SLM Winterthur, BBC Baden
- Build date: 1922
- Total produced: 1
Specifications
- Configuration
  - UIC: (1′Bo1′)+(1′Bo1′)
- Gauge: 1,435 mm (4 ft 8 1/2 in)
- Wheel diameter: 1,610 mm (63.4 in)
- Trailing dia.: 950 mm (37.4 in)
- Length: 21,000 mm (68 ft 11 in) over buffers
- Adhesive weight: 73 tonnes (72 long tons; 80 short tons)
- Loco weight: 127 tonnes (125 long tons; 140 short tons)
- Electric system/s: 15 kV 16 2/3 Hz AC catenary
- Current pickup(s): Pantograph
- Traction motors: Four
- Transmission: Buchli drive, Tschanz drive
- MU working: Not available
- Loco brake: Air
- Train brakes: Air
- Safety systems: Signum
Performance figures
- Maximum speed: 90 km/h (56 mph)
- Power output: Continuous: 1,620 kW (2,170 hp) at 65 km/h (40 mph); One hour: 1,885 kW (2,528 hp) at 62 km/h (39 mph)
Career
- Operators: SBB
- Numbers: 11100 (11300 from 1929)
- Nicknames: Bastard, Tatzelwurm, Grandmother
- Withdrawn: 31 December 1964

The Ae 4/8 was a prototype locomotive of the Schweizerischen Bundesbahnen (Swiss Federal Railways) (SBB) for the testing of electrical operation. The locomotive was equipped with two different drives, therefore acquiring the nickname Bastard. Because of its three-part locomotive body it also acquired the nickname Tatzelwurm.

== History ==
During the First World War the SBB decided to establish electric operation on their main lines as fast as possible, in order to become independent of coal supplies which had to be obtained from their warring neighbouring countries. Since electric traction technology was still new, suitable locomotive configurations had to be found.

Therefore, the SBB ordered several prototype locomotives. In addition to the Be 3/5 12201, Be 4/6 12301, Be 4/6 12302 and Ce 6/8^{I} 14201 with coupling rods, the SBB procured the Be 2/5 prototype locomotive with fully spring-loaded drives. When tested in the operational environment, this locomotive turned out to be too weak and too slow. As early as 1919 the SBB ordered a second prototype locomotive from SLM and BBC; as with the Be 4/6 this prototype locomotive would have four drive axles. The specified requirements corresponded to those of the Be 4/6; however, for the operation of express trains, a maximum speed of 90 km/h (56 mph) was required.

== Layout ==
=== Mechanical layout ===
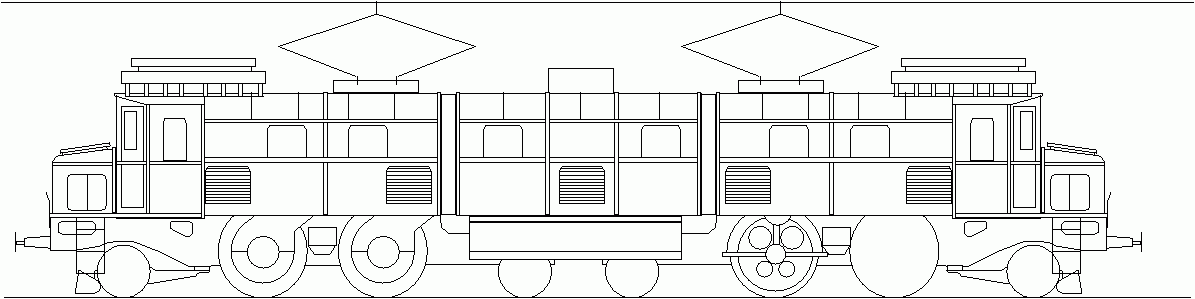
Side view

The Be 4/6 utilized the maximum axle load of 20 t (20 long tons; 22 short tons) fully. The motors for the Ae 4/8 were heavier than those of the Be 4/6, therefore the Ae 4/8 was planned with two more idle axles from the beginning. In contrast to the Be 4/6 bogie locomotive the Ae 4/8 was built as a frame locomotive with a double articulated body. This articulated layout allowed good operation on curves, even with the heavy, frame mounted motors. The locomotive was nicknamed Tatzelwurm because of this layout.

The locomotive consisted of three bodies connected by gaiters, the two outer bodies with short cabinets. The chassis consisted of two short-coupled frames. Each of them contained two drive axles, one leading Bissel axle and one trailing Adams axle. The frames were – as with the Be 4/7 – coupled directly by a connecting rod and two auxiliary couplers. The outer bodies were fixed to the frames, while the centre body lay on a bridging slab, which did not transfer any tractive or pressure forces. The bridging slab rested on the outer frames over a pivot, and via horizontal springs between the inner drive axles and the Adams axles.

The transformer was mounted in the centre part of the locomotive. For removing the transformer the roof of the centre locomotive body was detachable. The roofs of the outer parts of the locomotive body were detachable separately from the left or right side. The side elements of the three parts of the locomotive body were detachable in segments. The centre body, including the bridging slab, was removable as a whole. The cabinet of cab 1 contained two compressors, while the cabinet of cab 2 contained the brake transformer, a lifting jack and a toolbox.

The locomotive was equipped with four identical motors which were mounted fixed in the frames. The fully sprung drives were different on each frame, therefore the locomotive was also nicknamed Bastard. On side 1 Tschanz drives were mounted. The basic feature of this drive was the gimbal principle for the transmission of the torque between the big gearwheel, which was part of the gearbox connected to the unsprung motor, and the suspended drive axle. Because the gimbal-drives were able to be very short it was possible to omit – in contrast to the Be 2/5 – the hollow shaft to the other side of the locomotive. The diameter of the big gearwheel was limited by the loading gauge, therefore the cog transmission had to be cascaded in two steps because the engine speed of all four motors was identical. Side 2 contained single side-mounted Buchli drives. Due to the great weight of those drives they were mounted transversally. The installation of the drive on both sides – as was used on the Be 2/5 – was not considered necessary any more.

The brake equipment of the locomotive was:

- drive wheels with brakes on both sides
- inner idle wheels single-side braked
- outer idle wheels non-braked
- one braking rod for each locomotive frame
- automatic air brake with single releasing brake valves of the Westinghouse type.
- direct working through brake
- handbrake from both cabs to the respective part of the locomotive
- electrical brake (see the next section)
- The Ae 4/8 never had divided brake shoes or automatic braking rod adjustment

The locomotive's total weight of 127 t (125 long tons; 140 short tons) – coincidentally, the same as the later Ae 4/7 – led to an average weight of 18.6 t (18.3 long tons; 20.5 short tons) per axle, within the specified 20 t (20 long tons; 22 short tons) limit. The axle load was not balanced, though; side 1 had significantly higher axle loads. The axle loads, starting at the Bissel axle of the locomotive (side 1), were in order: 14.0 t – 18.3 t – 18.6 t – 14.5 t – 14.2 t – 18.1 t – 17.9 t – 11.2 t

Because of this imbalance the use of the sand distributor was very important. Each drive wheel could be fed with sand, in either direction of travel, by compressed air.

=== Electrical layout ===
The electrical part of the locomotive was adapted from the Be 4/6 12303, with changed components:

- higher power output from the motors (4 x 490 kW (660 hp) instead of 4 x 370 kW (500 hp) over 1 hour)
- electrical brake as on the Be 4/6 12313 and successors

The transformer, oil operated main switch and stepping switch were located in the centre body. The power supply was obtained from the catenary via the two diamond-shaped pantographs mounted on each end body. At the start of a journey, both pantographs had to be lifted since they were only equipped with a single sliding bar without rocker. The cabinets for the reversing pole shunts and the brake resistors were mounted in front of the pantographs, towards the ends of the outer bodies.

The 18-step flat track BBC stepping switch was mounted on the transformer. It was driven by a battery supplied direct-current motor. Initially the stepping switch was controlled by a crank handle, later by a control wheel. It was possible to operate the stepping switch by hand, but only by someone actually at the switch inside the centre locomotive body.

The transformer oil was carried through cooling tubes located on both sides under the centre locomotive body. An oil pump was used to circulate the oil. Each cooling tube system was mounted inside a duct. A fan blew air from the interior of the body through this system.

The motors in the end bodies were connected in series circuit. The electrical isolation of one locomotive side was possible by blocking the respective reversing switch.

The electrical brake was an AC excited resistor brake. Together with the reversing pole shunts they were mounted on the roof over the cabs, where they were cooled by the head wind.

The locomotive was equipped with the following auxiliary systems:

- two compressors
- a converter group for battery charging
- one shared fan for the two Tschanz-drive motors
- two fans with a shared motor for the BBC-drive motors
- an oil pump
- cab heating

== Service ==
At the time of the introduction of electric traction the locomotives looked strange to the railway staff. The air grilles resembled wrinkles, therefore the locomotive was sometimes nicknamed grandmother.

After its delivery in March 1922 the locomotive was used first on the Bern–Thun line, because this line was the first one electrified with the necessary 15 kV 16 2/3 Hz AC. Unlike the prototype locomotives with rod drives, the Ae 4/8 was never used on the adjacent Lötschbergbahn (Bern-Lötschberg-Simplon railway) from Thun to Brig. The locomotive was not based in Bern for long; its service there was followed by a test phase on various lines including the Gotthardbahn (Gotthard railway).

In 1925 the locomotive was assigned to the Basel depot, where it remained until its withdrawal from service. In 1927 its roster included – together with two Ae 4/7s – two fast train pairs Basel–Zürich and back with a daily run of 416 km (258 mi).

With its performance (about 90% of that of the Ae 4/7), the locomotive was universally operable. The maximum speed of 90 km/h (56 mph) allowed them to pull fast trains, therefore the locomotive was often used when capacity needed to be doubled. In this role the locomotive led fast trains to Zürich, Chur, Lucerne, Bern and Spiez.

Often the Ae 4/8 worked freight trains to Zürich and Winterthur. During its last years of service the locomotive was used for Basel – Zürich – Winterthur services, and then commuter trains around Olten and freight trains around Solothurn.

In 1961 the locomotive was fitted with new cogwheels in the Tschanz drives. But on October 7, 1964 a driver reported a flashover at the step switch, and as a result of this the locomotive was towed to the Zürich repair workshop. Unfortunately the workshop was busy because of the additional services it had to provide for the 1964 Swiss National Exhibition (Expo 64), and the locomotive was stored for the time being. The SBB general management had decided to withdraw all of the veteran locomotives after Expo 64, so the Ae 4/8 was promptly scrapped.

The technical importance of the locomotive was marginal. At the moment of the handover of the Ae 4/8, six Be 4/7s with the Westinghouse drive, and the first few Ae 3/6^{I}s with the BBC drive, were already in service. Because of its complexity the Tschanz drive was not developed any further. The last remaining parts of this drive were scrapped at the Zürich workshop in 1967.

== External appearance ==
Originally the locomotive was, as with many SBB electric locomotives, painted brown, which was later changed to green. At its procurement in 1922 the locomotive was classified as Ae 4/8 and numbered 11000; in 1929 the number was changed to 11300. The same number was assigned later to a Re 4/4^{II}.
