= Bridel (surname) =

Bridel is a surname. Notable people with the surname include:

- AJ Bridel (born c. 1994), Canadian actress and singer
- Bedřich Bridel (1619–1680, also known as Fridrich Bridelius), Czech baroque writer, poet and missionary
- Doyen Bridel (1757–1845), Swiss writer
- Marc Bridel (1883–1931), French pharmacist and chemist
- Samuel Élisée von Bridel (1761–1828, also known as Samuel Elisée Bridel-Brideri), Swiss botanist
