= Barbaise =

- Commune
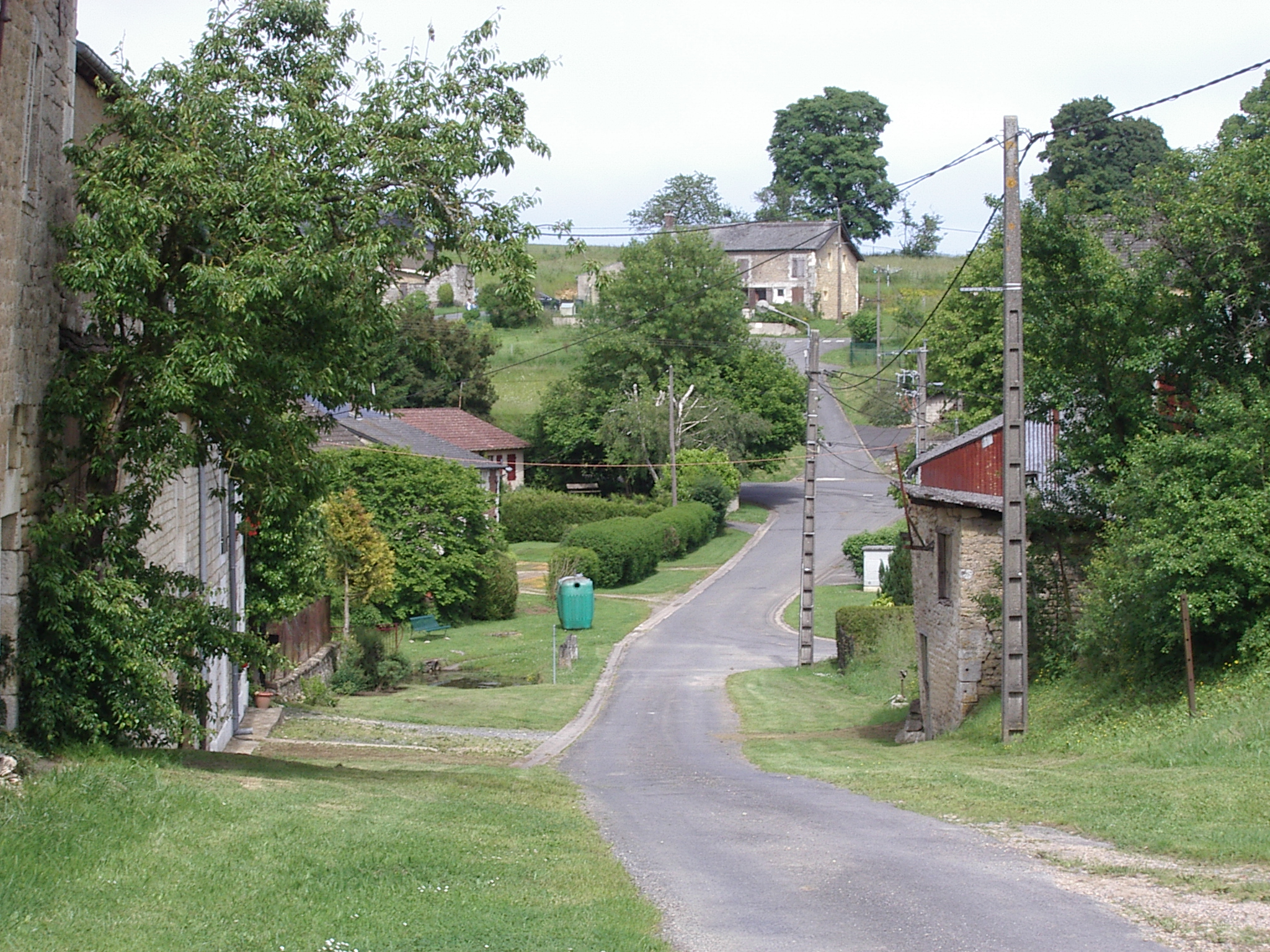
- A general view of Barbaise
- Location of Barbaise
- Location within France Location within Grand Est
- Coordinates: 49°39′55″N 4°34′49″E
- Country: France
- Region: Grand Est
- Department: Ardennes
- Arrondissement: Charleville-Mézières
- Canton: Signy-l'Abbaye

Government
  - Mayor (2020–2026): Michel Bouquet
- Area^{1}: 6.68 km^{2} (2.58 sq mi)
- Elevation: 192 m (630 ft)
- Population (2023): 102
  - Density: 15.3/km^{2} (39.5/sq mi)
- Time zone: UTC+01:00 (CET)
  - Summer (DST): UTC+02:00 (CEST)
- INSEE/Postal code: 08047 /08430
- ^{1} French Land Register data, which excludes lakes, ponds, glaciers > 1 km^{2} (0.386 sq mi or 247 acres) and river estuaries.

Barbaise (French pronunciation: [baʁbɛz]) is a commune in the Ardennes department in the Grand Est region of northern France.

== Geography ==
Barbaise is located at an altitude of 209 metres some 16 km south-west of Charleville-Mézières and 30 km north-east of Rethel. Access to the commune is by the D3 road from Jandun in the east which passes through the centre of the commune and continues north-east to Warnécourt. Access to the village is by the D203 which branches off the D3 in the commune and goes south to the village. The commune is mostly farmland with forests in the north-east and north of the commune.

The Ruisseau de Barbileuse rises in the village and flows south to join the Vence south-west of Raillicourt.

== Administration ==
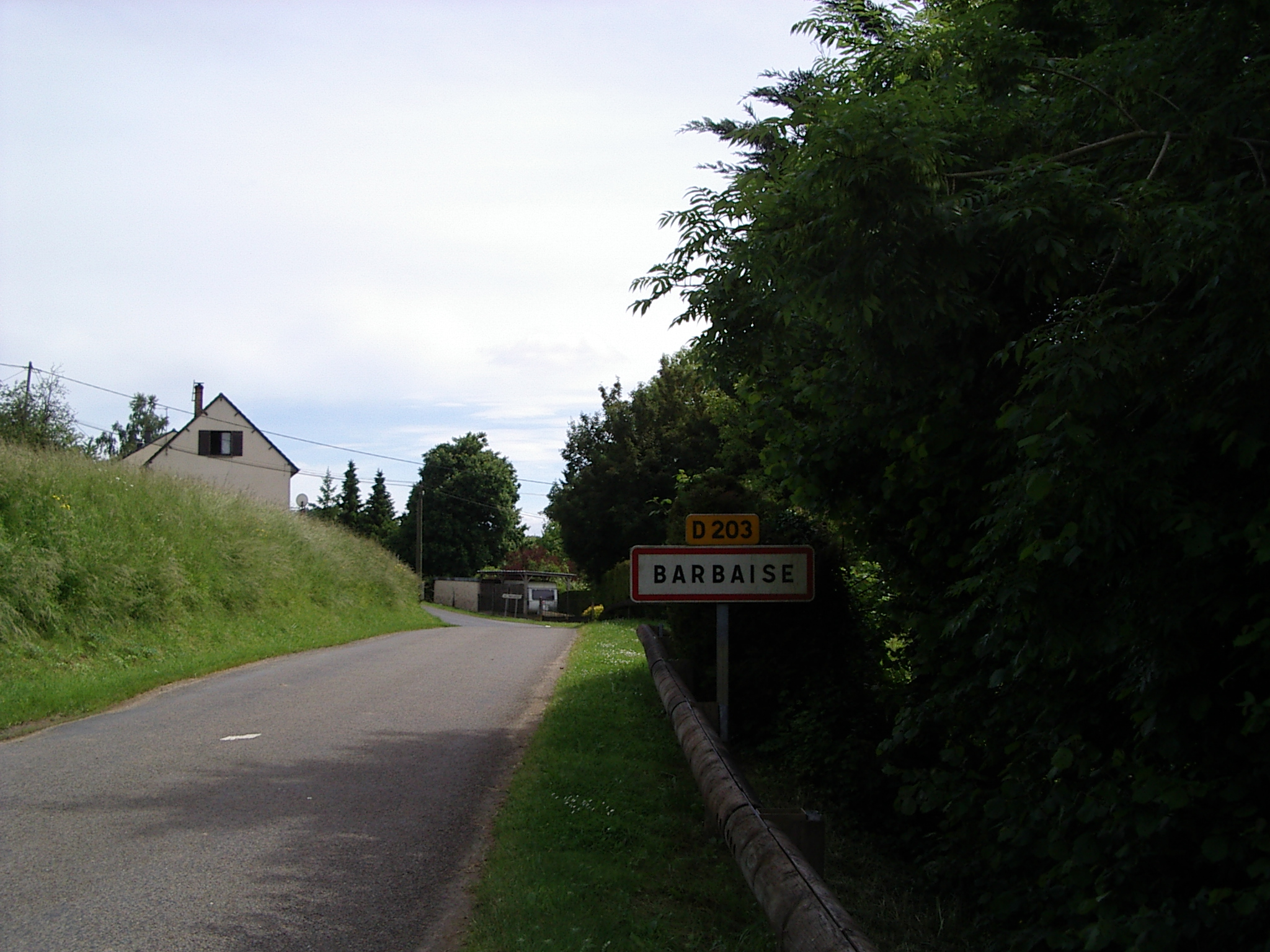
Entry to Barbaise

List of Successive Mayors

From	To	Name
1991	2026	Michel Bouquet

== Demography ==
Historical population

Year	Pop.	±% p.a.
1793	255	—
1821	345	+1.09%
1846	369	+0.27%
1872	292	−0.90%
1901	184	−1.58%
1926	150	−0.81%
1946	105	−1.77%
1962	96	−0.56%
1968	69	−5.36%

Year	Pop.	±% p.a.
1975	75	+1.20%
1982	96	+3.59%
1990	115	+2.28%
1999	106	−0.90%
2007	105	−0.12%
2012	96	−1.78%
2017	101	+1.02%
2023	102	+0.16%

Source: EHESS and INSEE

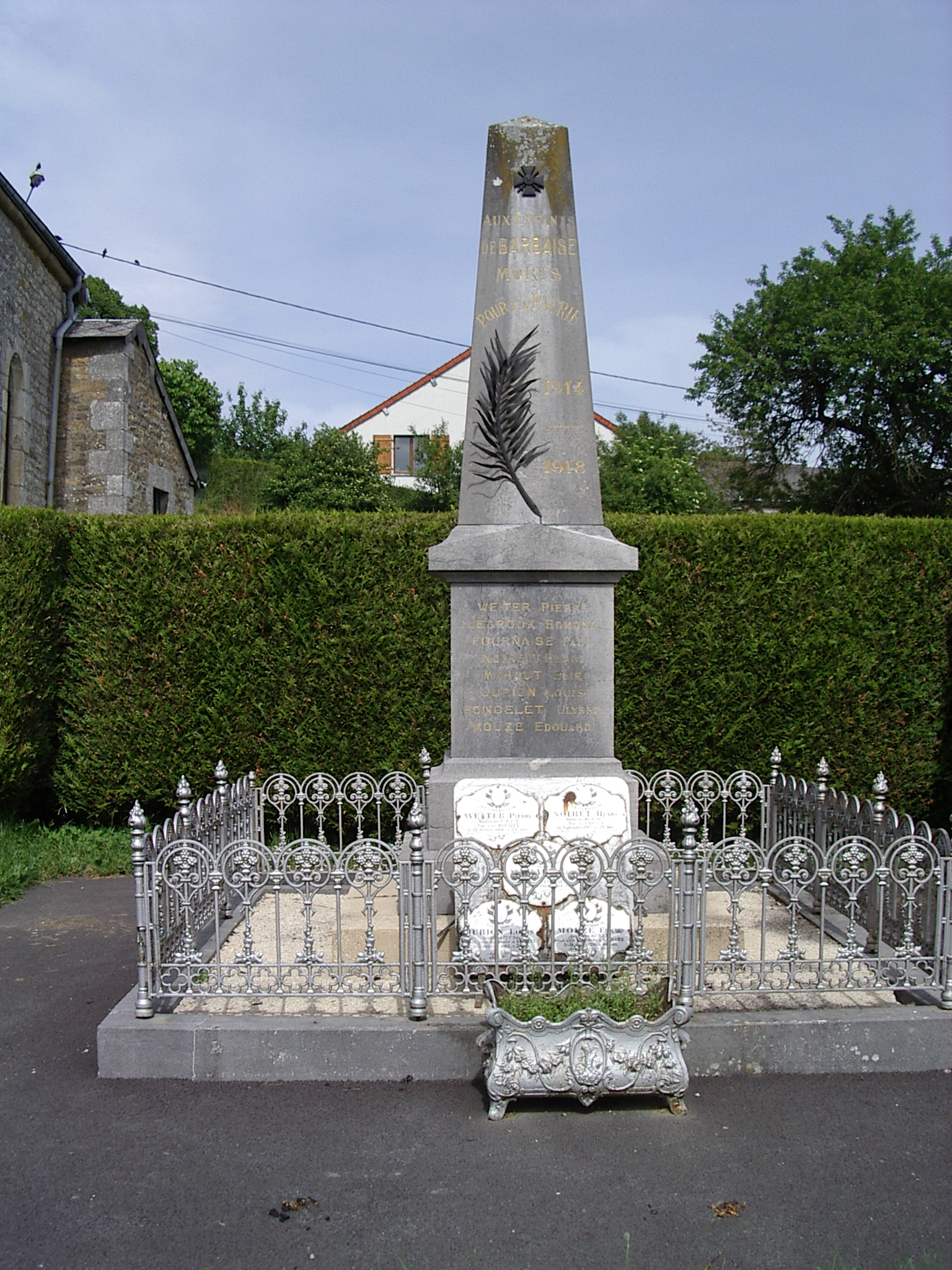
The War Memorial

== Sites and monuments ==
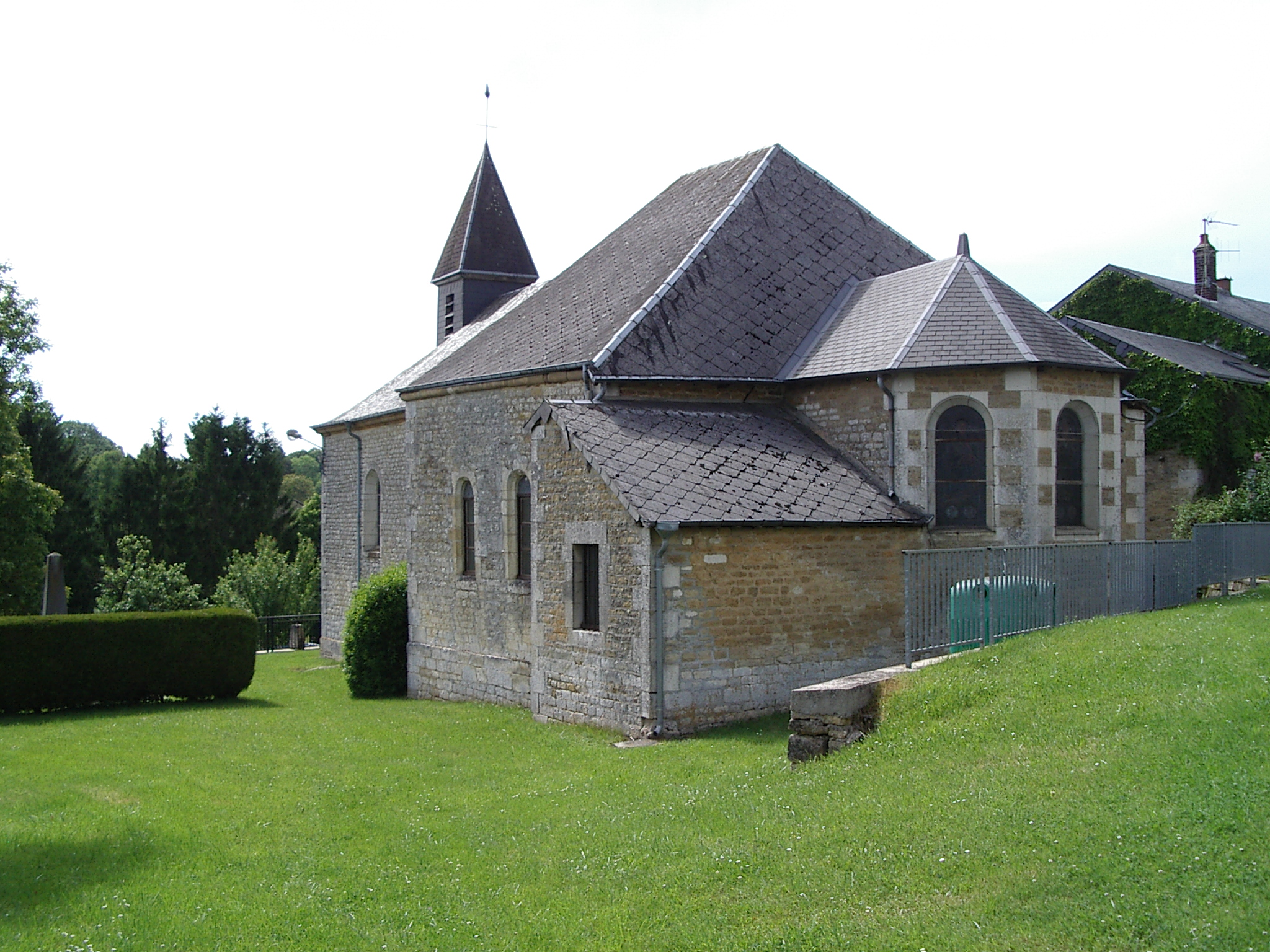
The Church of Barbaise

- The Church of Barbaise contains three items that are registered as historical objects:
  - A Celebrant's Chair (17th century)
  - A Statue: Christ on the Cross (16th century)
  - A Group Sculpture: Saint Anne instructing the Virgin (15th century)

== See also ==
- Communes of the Ardennes department
