= Bridel (disambiguation) =

Bridel is a town in the commune of Kopstal in central Luxembourg.

Bridel may also refer to:

- an old-English word for bridle
- Bridel (surname)
- a French dairy product trade mark owned by Lactalis
