= Midi E 3301 =

Swiss experimental locomotive

Midi E 3300 SBB CFF FFS Be 2/5
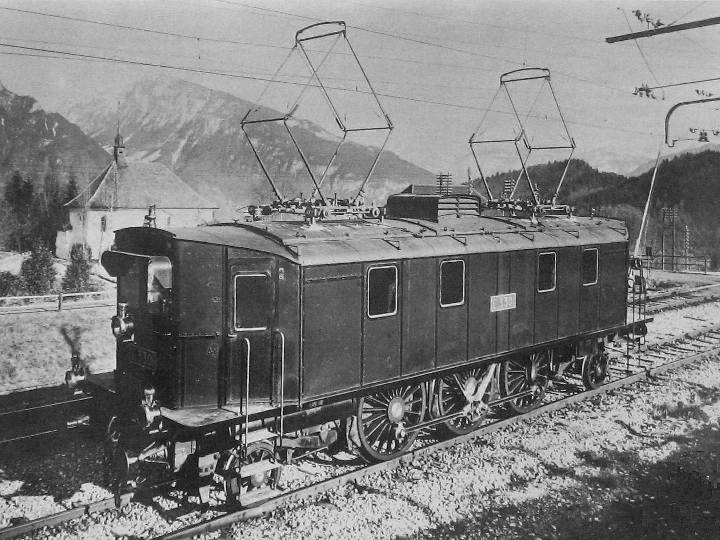
- Electric locomotive Chemins de Fer du Midi E 3301 on the Bern-Lötschberg-Simplon line, later SBB Be 2/5 11001
Type and origin
- Power type: Electric
- Builder: SLM and Brown-Boveri
- Build date: 1910-1911
- Total produced: 1
Specifications
- Configuration
  - AAR: 1-C-1
  - UIC: 1′C1′
- Gauge: 1,435 mm (4 ft 8 1/2 in)
- Wheel diameter: 1610 mm
- Trailing dia.: 950 mm
- Adhesive weight: 33 tonnes
- Loco weight: 75 tonnes
- Power supply: Overhead line
- Electric system/s: Single phase AC, 12/15 kV, 16 2/3 Hz.
- Current pickup: 2 pantographs
- Traction motors: Two Deri repulsion motors
Performance figures
- Maximum speed: 75 km/h
- Power output: 660 kW (continuous); 736 kW (one hour)
Career
- Nicknames: Viktor

Midi E 3301 was a prototype electric locomotive of Class E 3300 designed for the Chemins de fer du Midi, France. Because of poor performance, it was refused by the Compagnie du Midi and was re-deployed to Swiss railways. On 1 May 1919, it was classified Fb 2/5 11001 and, in 1920, it became experimental locomotive Be 2/5 11001 of the Swiss Federal Railways (SBB).

== Overview ==
Many lines of the Midi network being mountain lines, the company began an electrification programme in 1909. The system chosen was single phase alternating current at 12 kV and 16 2/3 Hz.

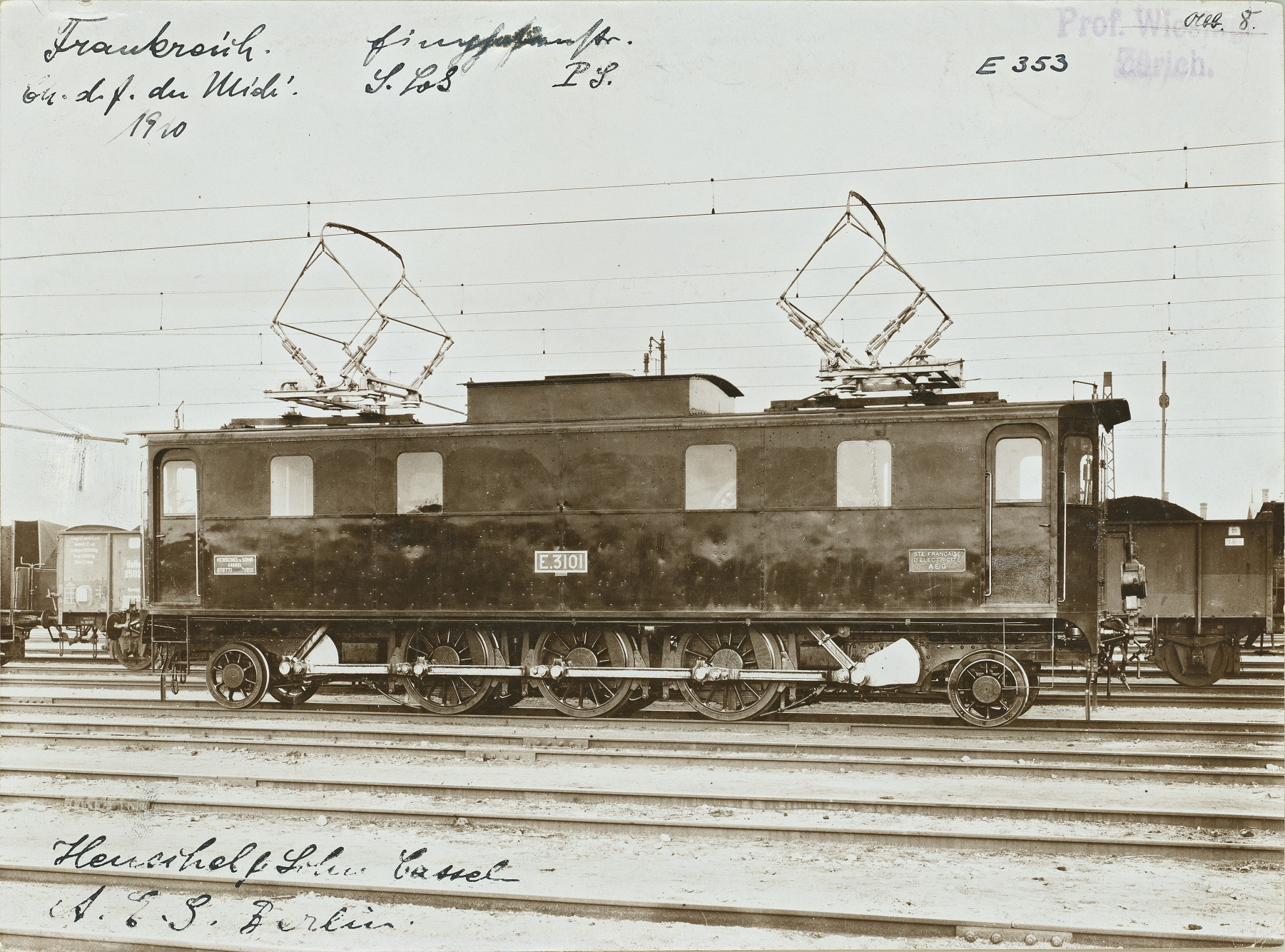
Prototype locomotive E.3101

Six prototype locomotives were ordered for the Perpignan - Villefranche-de-Conflent line. They were:

- E 3001 from Thomson and General Electric
- E 3101 from AEG and Henschel
- E 3201 from Westinghouse, later SNCF 1C1 3900
- E 3301 from Brown-Boveri and SLM Winterthur
- E 3401 from Ateliers du Nord et de l'Est
- E 3501 from Schneider

The E 3301 locomotive was expected to perform the following tasks:

- Haul a 400-ton train on a 2.2% gradient
- Haul a 300-ton train at 40 km/h on a 2.2% gradient
- Haul a 100-ton train at 60 km/h on a 2.2% gradient
- Be equipped with an electric brake for descents

== Technical details ==
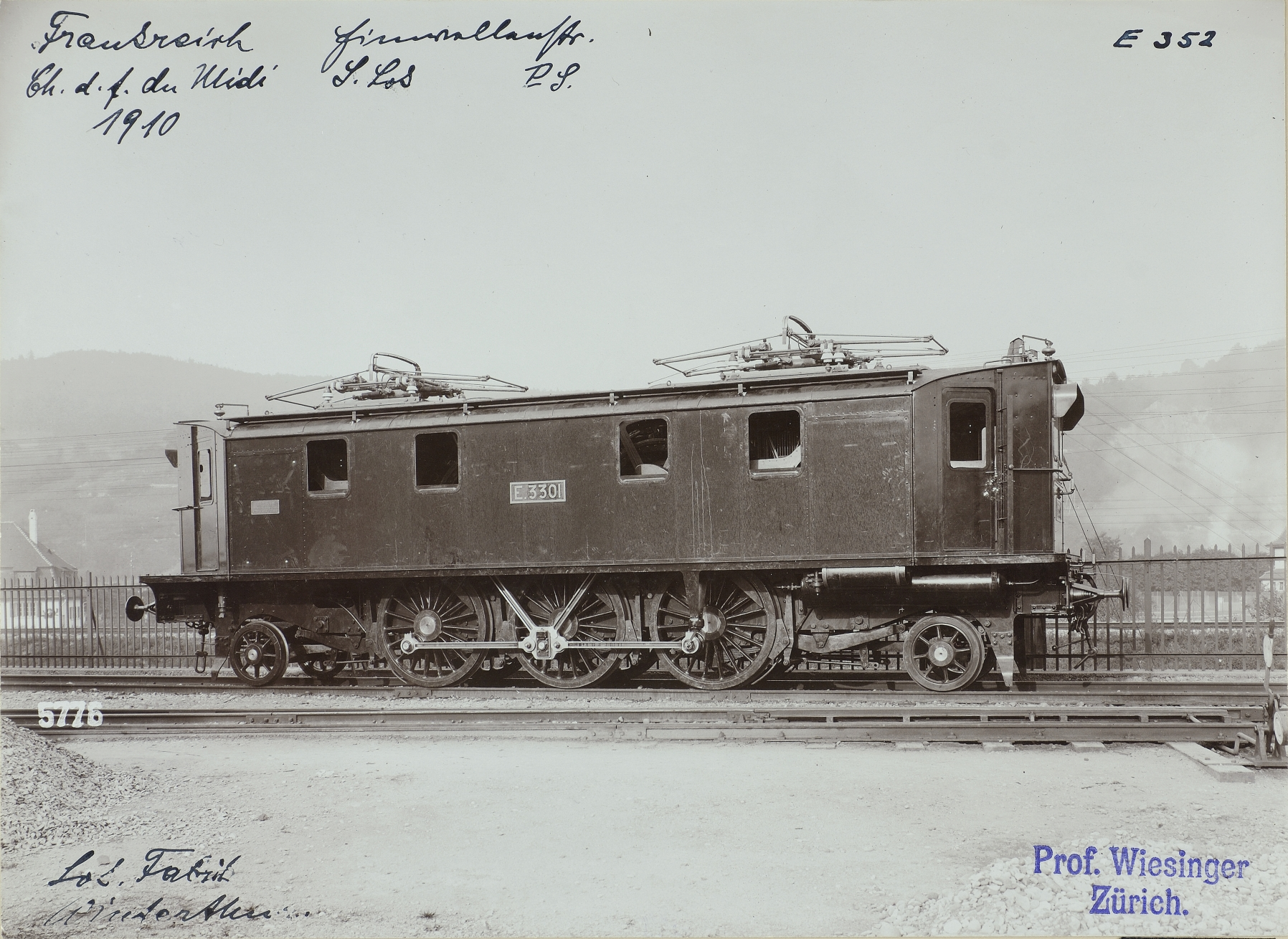
E 3301 in 1910

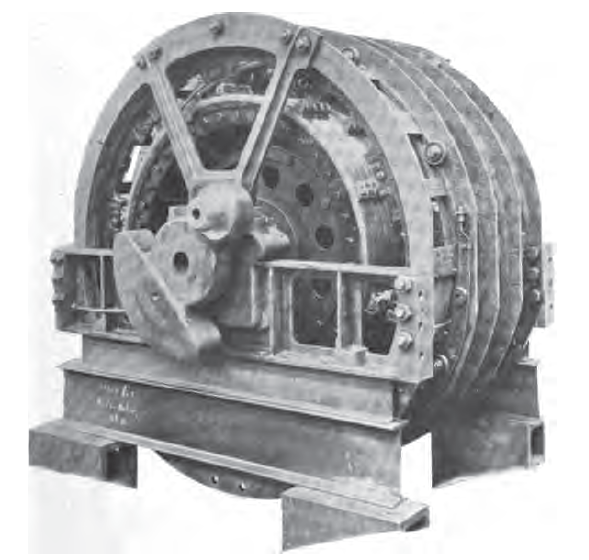
Brown-Boveri-Déri repulsion motor with 10 poles. Two of these motors were used in the French electric locomotive Midi E3301

The companies SLM Winterthur and Brown-Boveri built the E3301 locomotive in 1910-1911. Power was provided by two large Déri repulsion motors that filled almost the entire engine room. The speed and direction of the motors were controlled by brush-shifting, allowing the train to start without jolting. The motors were powered at 1,250 V by two traction transformers connected in parallel. The power of the motors was transmitted to the central axle by two inclined rods, without gears, then to the other drive axles by coupling rods.

== Trials ==
The E 3301, equipped with auxiliary transformer windings for 15 kV operation, was tested on the Spiez - Frutigen line. During these tests, some design faults became apparent. On 18 February 1912, the locomotive was transferred to Perpignan and trials continued until 16 August 1912. The locomotive was unable to deliver the required performance, as was the case for two other machines. Another gave partial satisfaction, but only E 3201 was fully satisfactory. The Midi also ordered railcars E ABD 1 to 30, which became Class Z 4900 of the SNCF.

== Modifications and axle drive testing ==
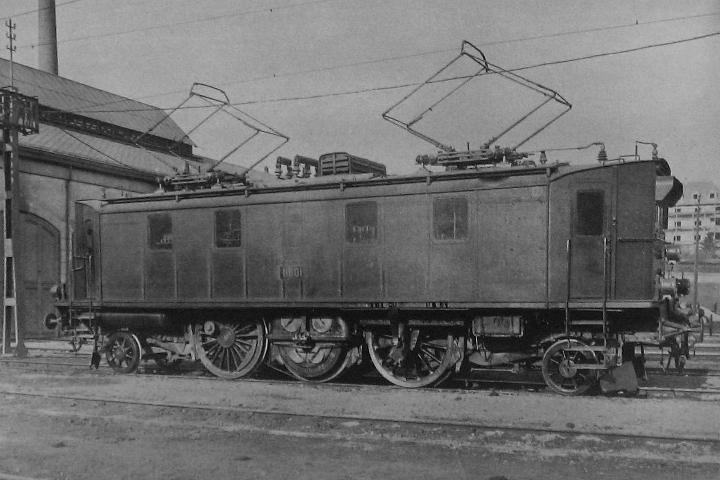
As modified, showing the different axle drives

Otto Tschanz, the SBB's senior mechanical engineer, suggested converting the surplus locomotive into a test vehicle for the new technique of individual axle drives that were replacing coupling rods. It was returned to Brown-Boveri and the original rod drives, traction motors and electrical equipment removed. The first driving axle was unpowered and converted to a carrying axle. As it was still balanced for the rod drive and these cast-in balances could not be removed, a new balance weight had to be fitted to the crankpin position. The centre axle was fitted with a Buchli drive and the third with Tschanz's own design of Tschanz drive. (Note: Similar tests with a mixed arrangement of axle drives were also tried later on the SBB-CFF-FFS Ae 4/8.) This Tschanz drive transmitted torque via a spur reduction gear and a cardan shaft running inside a hollow axle. As the Buchli drive was as yet untried, a drive was fitted on each side of the axle. This became the French practice, as on the SNCF 2D2 5500 and 9100, but in Switzerland a single-sided drive would be considered adequate. Overall this now gave a wheel arrangement changed from 1′C1′ to 1′1Bo1′.

The two transformers were replaced by a single one behind the first driver's cab, balancing the traction motors, and with a tap changer for power control.

== Service in Switzerland ==
The modified locomotive was first tested on the Lötschberg railway line. On 1 August 1918, it was officially handed over to the Bern–Lötschberg–Simplon railway (BLS) under number 2B1 10001 for the start of the tests.

Until 1919, the machine was used to haul passenger trains on the Thun–Spiez line. On 1 May 1919 it entered permanently the service of the SBB under the number Fb 2/5 10001. From the energizing of the line Bern–Spiez on 7 July 1919, it began to haul passenger trains. By the end of 1919, it had travelled 24,500 kilometres. In 1920, when it became Be 2/5 11001, it travelled a further 5,500 kilometres and, by 1921, the total was 35,300 kilometres. Around this time, the locomotive was nicknamed Viktor.

SBB were receiving new and better locomotives, so they looked for a new assignment for Viktor. On 1 June 1922, it was assigned to the Erstfeld depot to haul trains on the Erstfeld–Arth–Goldau and Erstfeld–Lucerne lines and covered an average daily distance of 224 km. Between 1923 and 1924, it also pulled passenger trains on the Gotthard line between Lucerne and Bellinzona. In 1924 it travelled only 2,000 kilometres, apparently because of accident damage.

In 1925, Viktor was transferred to the Lucerne depot and hauled trains to Rotkreuz (in the Canton of Zug), Zürich and Arth-Goldau and still travelled 202 kilometres daily average. Also in 1925, the train-heating boiler was replaced by a 1,000 volt electric train supply. From 1 October 1926, its use declined and it was used only occasionally on short freight trains. In May 1927, traffic to Rotkreuz and Arth-Goldau increased and Viktor was put back into service and travelled 135 km every day.

On 15 May 1928, the locomotive Be 3/5 12201 resumed its services and Viktor was relegated to shunting duties at Zürich depot. It covered only about 7,000 kilometres in 1928. In 1929, the mileage dropped to 592 km.

== Final years ==
In 1929, Viktor was converted into a self-propelled welding wagon Xe 1/5 n° 99999 which later became XTe 1/5 n° 99999. It was withdrawn on 17 September 1937 and scrapped in December 1937.
