= Chemins de fer du Midi =

French railway company

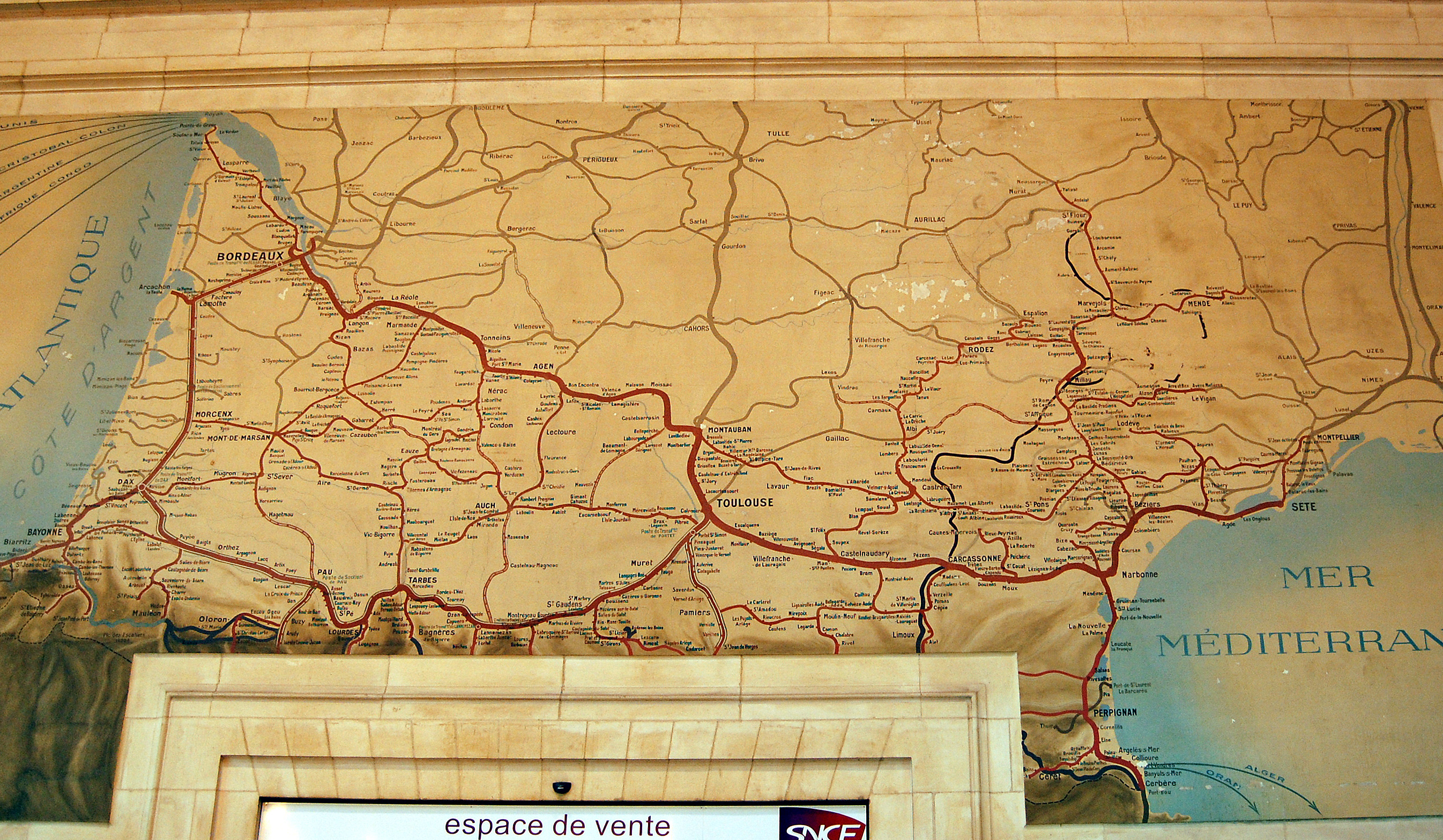
Map of the chemins de fer du Midi railway network in the station Bordeaux-Saint-Jean.

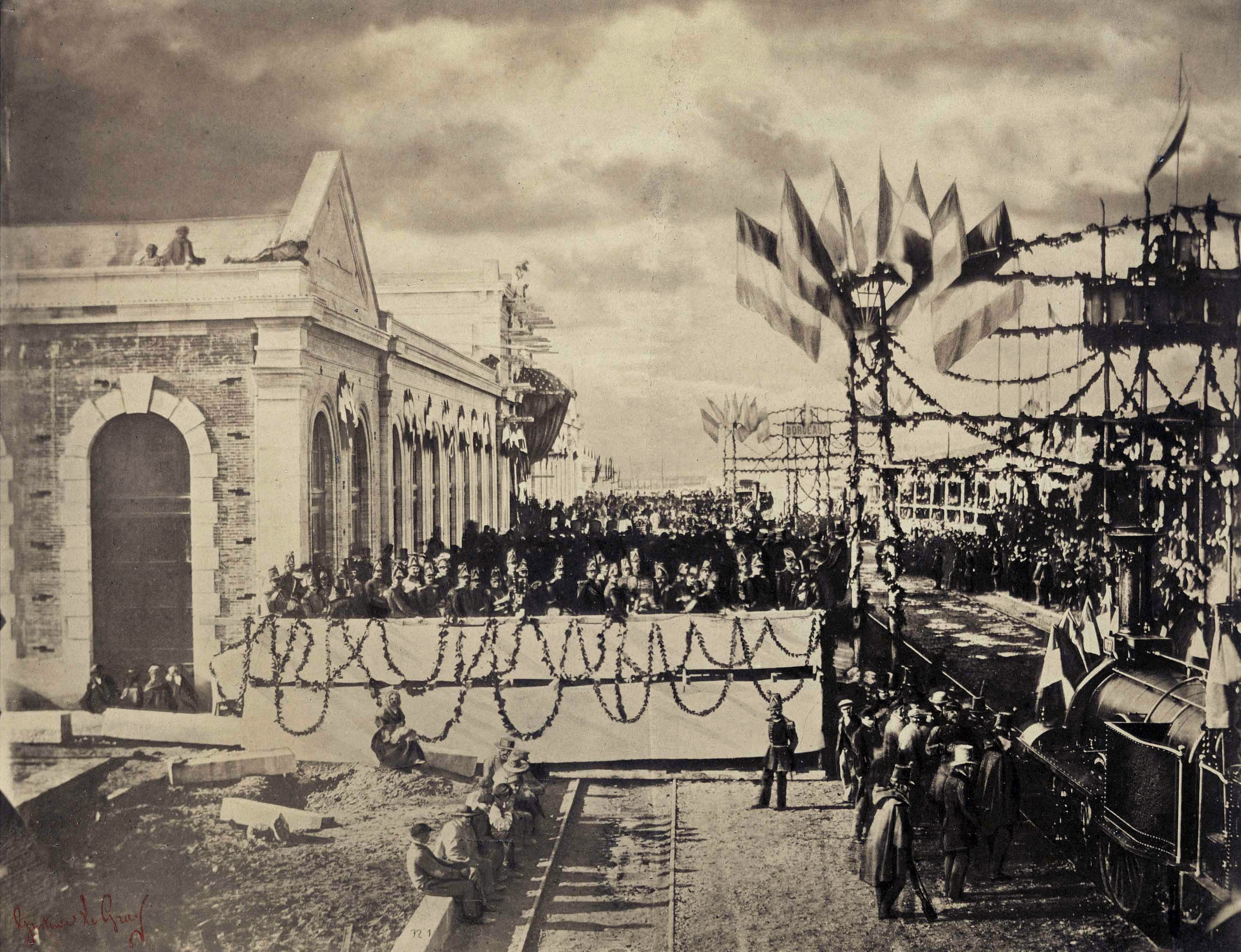
Inauguration of the Bordeaux-Sète line on April 2, 1857 at Toulouse-Matabiau station.

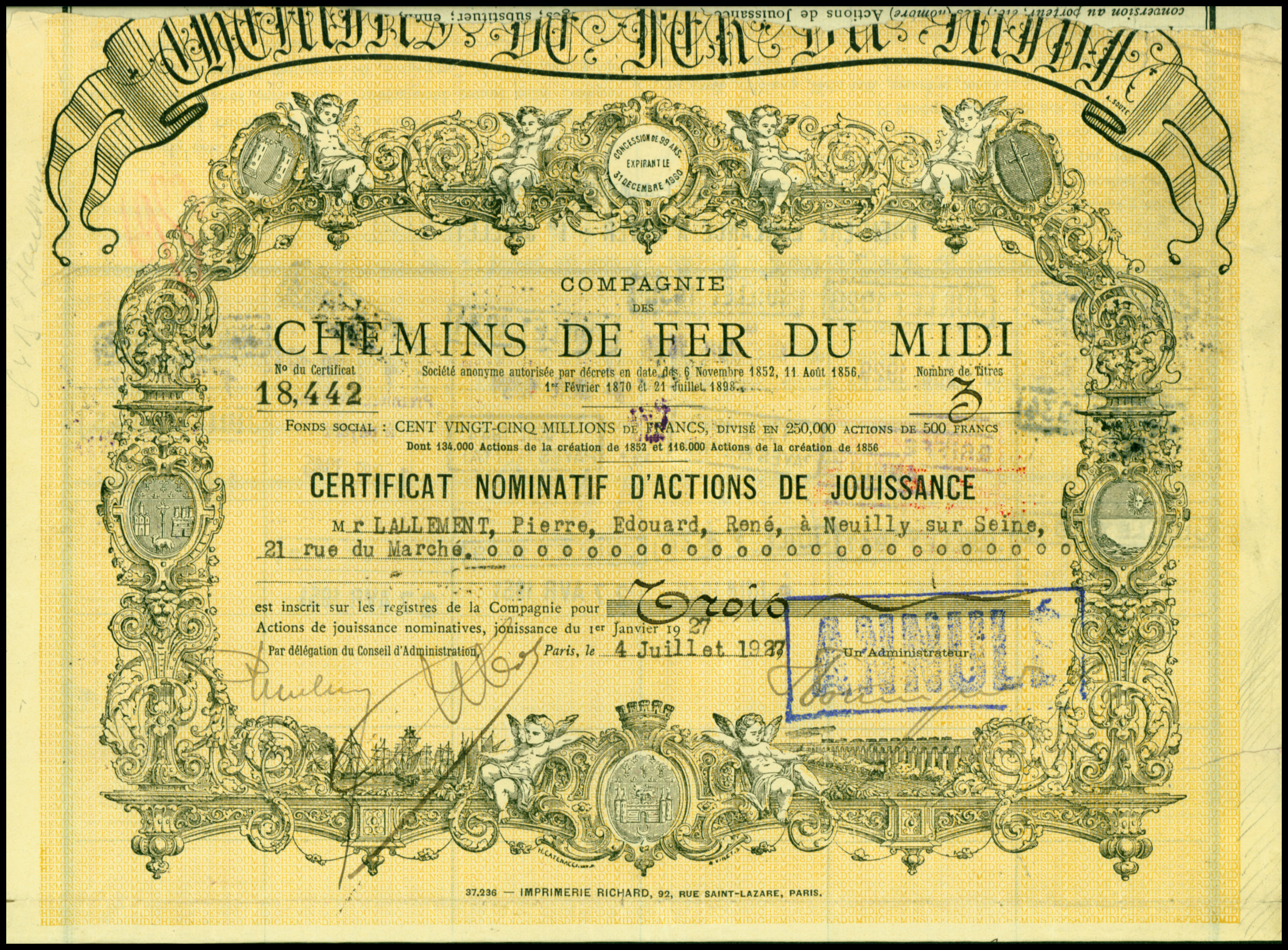
Participation certificate of the Compagnie des Chemins de Fer du Midi, issued 4. July 1927

The Compagnie des chemins de fer du Midi (French pronunciation: [kɔ̃paɲi de ʃəmɛ̃ də fɛʁ dy midi], abbr. CF du Midi), also known in English as the Midi or Southern Railway, was an early French railway company which operated a network of routes in the southwest of the country, chiefly in the area between its main line – which ran from Bordeaux, close to the Atlantic coast, to Sète on the Mediterranean – and the Pyrenees.

The company was established by the Pereire brothers, who thus broke the virtual monopoly held in France by James Rothschild on the slow-paced railway projects taking place in the area of Paris during the 1840s and 1850s. The Rothschild branch of Paris responded by strengthening its grip on the sector with an alliance to the industrialist Talabot. The Pereires in turn founded their financial company Crédit Mobilier.

In 1934 the company was merged with the Chemin de fer de Paris à Orléans to become part of the Chemins de fer de Paris à Orléans et du Midi (PO-Midi).

In 1856, the Midi completed its rail line from Bordeaux to Toulouse. In 1857, it continued on from Toulouse through Narbonne to Sète. This put it in competition with the Canal du Midi, and on 28 May 1858 the railway took over the lease of the canal.

== Electrification ==
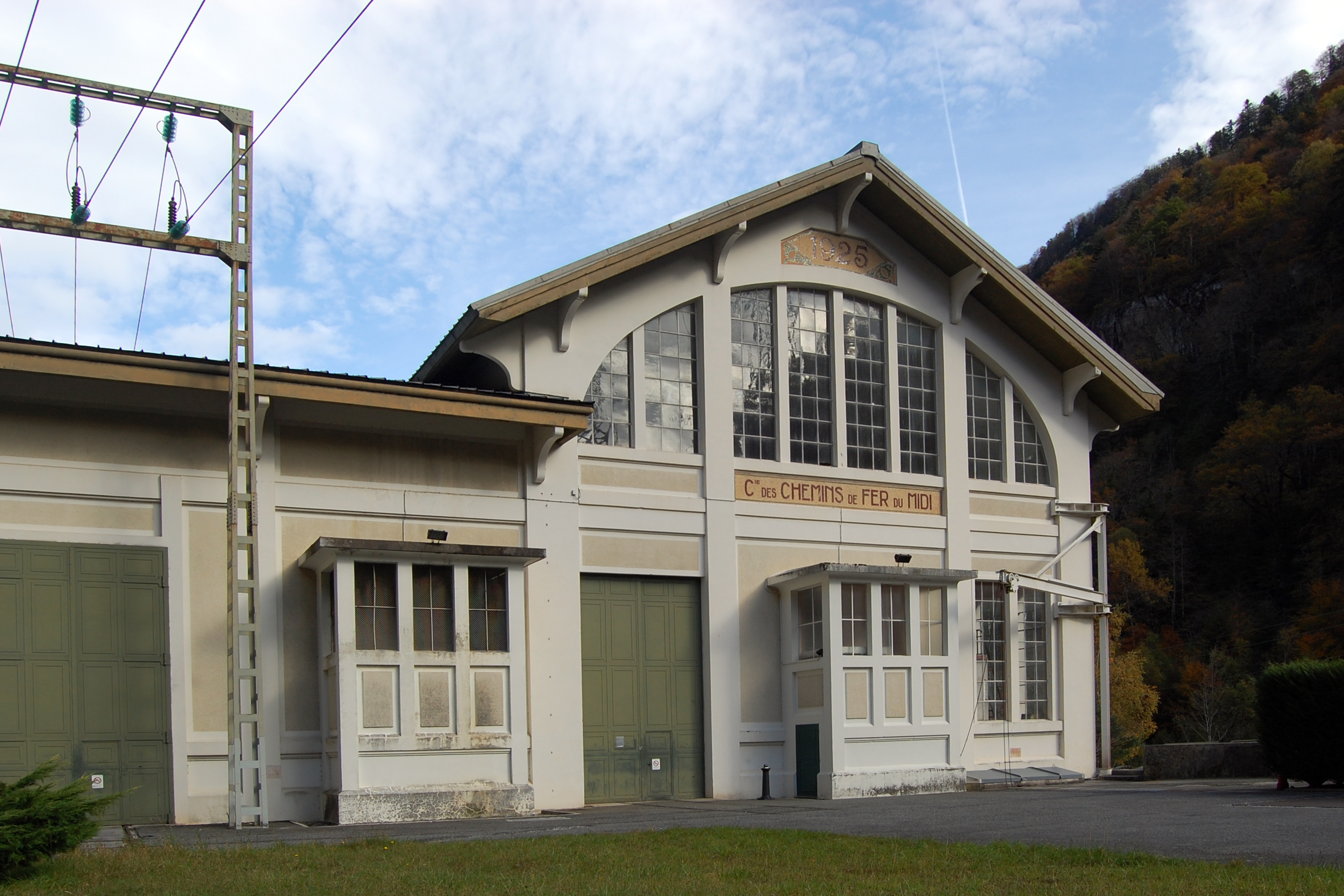
Compagnie des chemins de fer du Midi power station near Artouste

In 1909, the Compagnie du Midi launched a vast program of electrification of its lines under the impetus of the engineer Jean-Raoul Paul (1869-1960). It was a huge challenge for the time because it went far beyond the scope of railway operations alone. It was necessary to build infrastructure such as dams, power plants and distribution systems.

The company was far from coal production centres, so it was hard to get the fuel required for steam traction, and some coal was even imported from England. The proximity of the Pyrenees made hydropower generation possible and this favoured electrification. The shortage of coal during the war of 1914-1918, and especially its prohibitive cost after the war, provided further impetus for electrification. After investigations in Switzerland and Germany, a system using alternating current (AC) at 12 kV and 16 2/3 Hz was chosen for economic reasons. The three-phase system was rejected as being too complex so a single-phase system was chosen.

The narrow-gauge Cerdanya line was electrified from the start because its gradients (up to 6%) were too steep for steam traction. The Perpignan - Villefranche-de-Conflent line (Pyrénées-Orientales) was chosen as the site for future tests because it provided conditions of both plain and mountain. This was the only line that was not later converted to 1,500 volts. It operated thus until 1971. From 1911, the company tried six different types of overhead line system and chose the American Westinghouse system. This design was very simple and was capable of absorbing temperature variations.

Even before the end of the tests, the company became a candidate for the construction of Eastern and Western trans-Pyrenees railways. Electric traction was chosen from the outset, reducing construction costs by allowing steeper gradients and sharper curves. The company then began an intensive electrification programme for the network, including work on the tracks, the construction of hydroelectric plant for the production of electrical energy and the creation of a distribution network for the transport of this energy.

On 29 August 1920, the government imposed the 1500 V direct current (DC) system, mainly because the army did not want to use the same system as Germany. The reaction of the Midi was immediate and the company launched, in December 1920, new electrification programmes at 1500 V. From 1923, all facilities operated at 1500 V, except the Perpignan - Villefranche-de -Conflent line. In less than two years, the Midi network had succeeded in converting. The programme of electrification of the Midi was impressive because, in only a dozen years, the electrified network of the Midi formed a coherent whole. The programme ended in 1932, with the exception of the Montauban - Sète link, which was only switched on in 1935 after the signing of an agreement with the Chemin de fer de Paris à Orléans (PO).

=== Electric locomotives ===
Where numbers appear inconsistent, this may be because Midi and SNCF used different numbering systems.

Alternating current

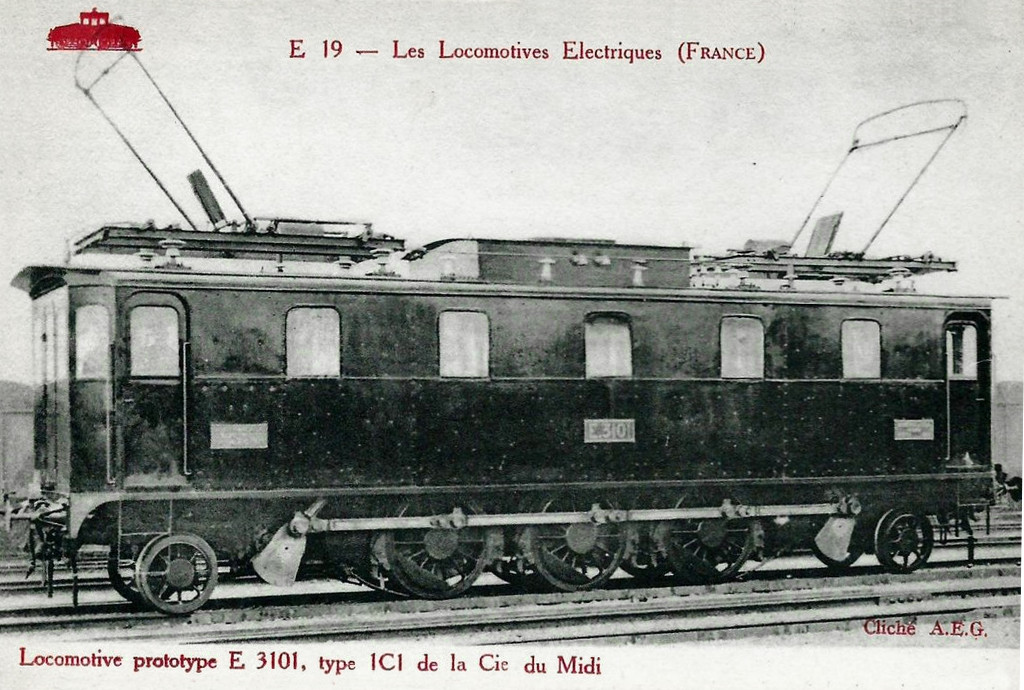
The prototype 1′C1′ locomotive, E 3101

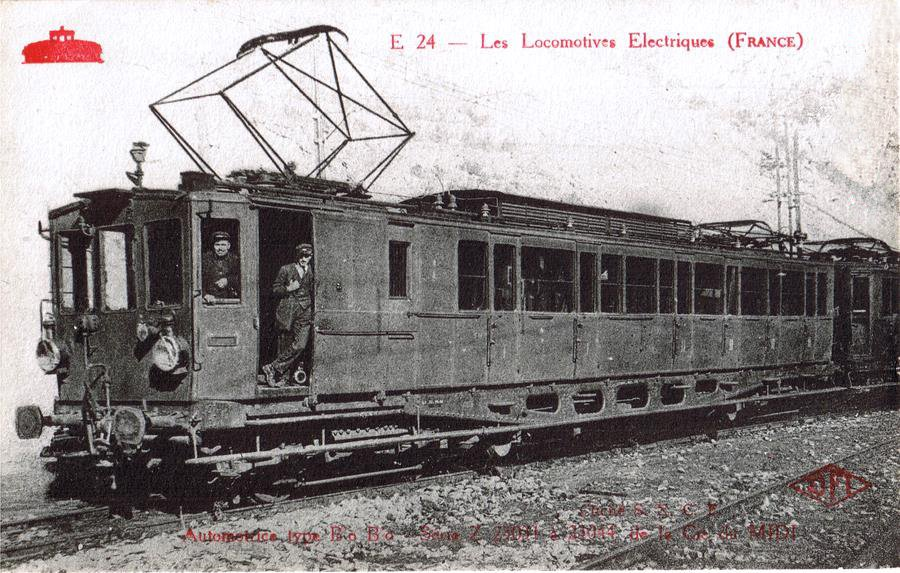
SNCF Z 4900 class railcar

Six prototype locomotives were ordered:
Midi numbers first

- E 3001 from Thomson and General Electric
- E 3101 from AEG and Henschel
- E 3201 from Westinghouse, later SNCF 1C1 3900
- E 3301 from Brown-Boveri and SLM Winterthur
- E 3401 from Ateliers du Nord et de l'Est
- E 3501 from Schneider
- Z 23031-23044, railcar, later SNCF Z 4900 class
- Z 23051-23063, railcar, later converted to 1,500 V DC to become SNCF Z 4500 class

Direct current

SNCF numbers first

  - 2C2 3100, previously Midi E 3101-10
  - SNCF class 2D2 5000, previously Midi E 4801-4824
  - SNCF class BB 1500, previously Midi E 4001-40
  - SNCF class BB 1600, previously Midi E 4501-50
  - SNCF class BB 4100, previously Midi E 4101-4190
  - SNCF class BB 4200, previously Midi E 4201-4250
  - SNCF class BB 4600, previously Midi E 4601-4650
  - SNCF class BB 4700, previously Midi E 4701-4717
  - SNCF class BB 4730, rebuilds of some BB 4200 and BB 4700 locomotives
  - SNCF class Z 4200, railcar, Midi Z 23201-215
  - SNCF class Z 4300, railcar, Midi Z 23001-015
  - SNCF class Z 4500, railcar, Midi Z 23051-063

== See also ==
- Type 032 T
