= Tatzelwurm =

Mythical creature

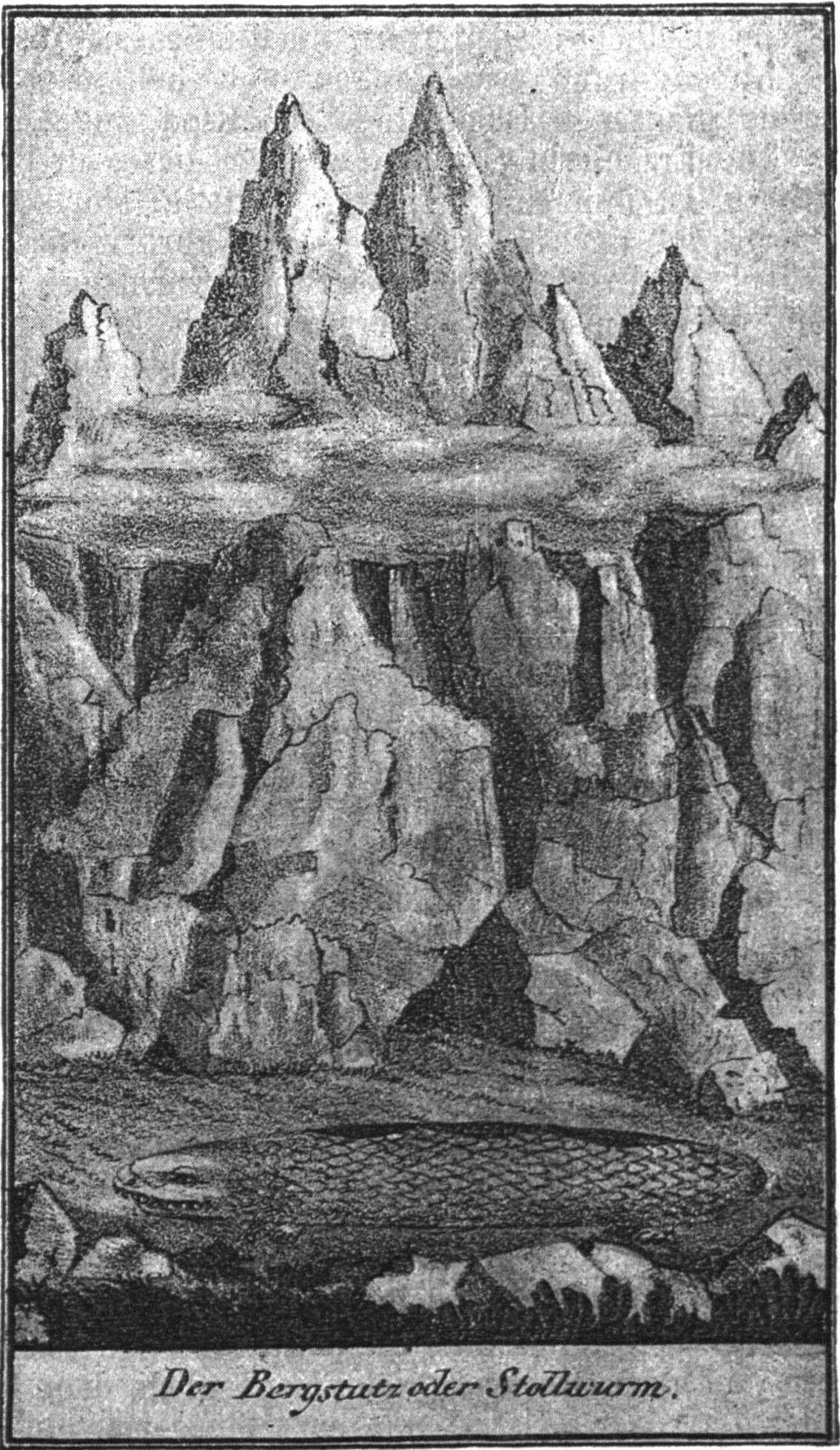
Bergstutz or Stollwurm

In the folklore of the Alpine region of south-central Europe, the Tatzelwurm (German: [ˈtatsl̩ˌvʊʁm]), Stollenwurm, or Stollwurm is a lizard-like creature, essentially a sort of dragon (see Germanic dragon), often described as having the face of a cat and a serpent-like body which may be slender or stubby. It is further described as having either four short legs or two forelegs with no hindlimbs, the latter a trait shared with many lindworms. Stories of essentially the same creature also exist in the folklore of South Sweden.

The creature is sometimes said to be venomous, or to attack with poisonous breath (a common trait in dragons, see atter), and to make a high-pitched or hissing sound.

Anecdotes describing encounters with the creature or briefly described lore about them can be found in several areas of Europe, including the Austrian, Bavarian, French, Italian and Swiss Alps. It has several other regional names, including Bergstutz, Springwurm, Praatzelwurm, and in French, arassas.

== Nomenclature ==
The name Tatzelwurm (Swiss German: Tazzelwurm) is not traditionally used in Switzerland, and the creature is usually known by the Swiss as Stollenwurm or Stollwurm ("tunnel worm" or "dragon of the mine-tunnels") in the Bernese Alps. The tunnel and underground motif can be found broadly elsewhere among Germanic dragons, like the lindworm, Fafnir and Nidhogg, the Swedish analogs, and flogdrake, among many more. Stollenwurm may also be interpreted to mean a "serpent" with "short, thick feet". (Note: This meaning of Stollen as "short feet" localized as the dialect of neighboring Canton of Aargau by some sources.)

Tatzelwurm was the term localized in Bavaria, Germany (with variants Daazlwurm and Praazlwurm) according to an early study. But Tatzelwurm later came into currency in Austria.

Bergstutz, Birgstutz or Birgstuz'n ("mountain-stump") was the local name used in places in Austria such as the state of Styria, parts of the Tyrol, (Note: Zillertal, Tyrol according to Dalla Torre.) Salzburg and the Salzkammergut region, and some parts of Bavaria (specifically Berchtesgaden), according to early studies. The name was simply Stutzn in the valleys of the Traun and Alm rivers of Austria. Also the form linwurm (cf. German: lindwurm).

In the French Alps, "arassas" was the applied name of the legendary cat-headed lizard.

Slovenian forms include: Daadzelwurm, Hockwurm.

== Description ==
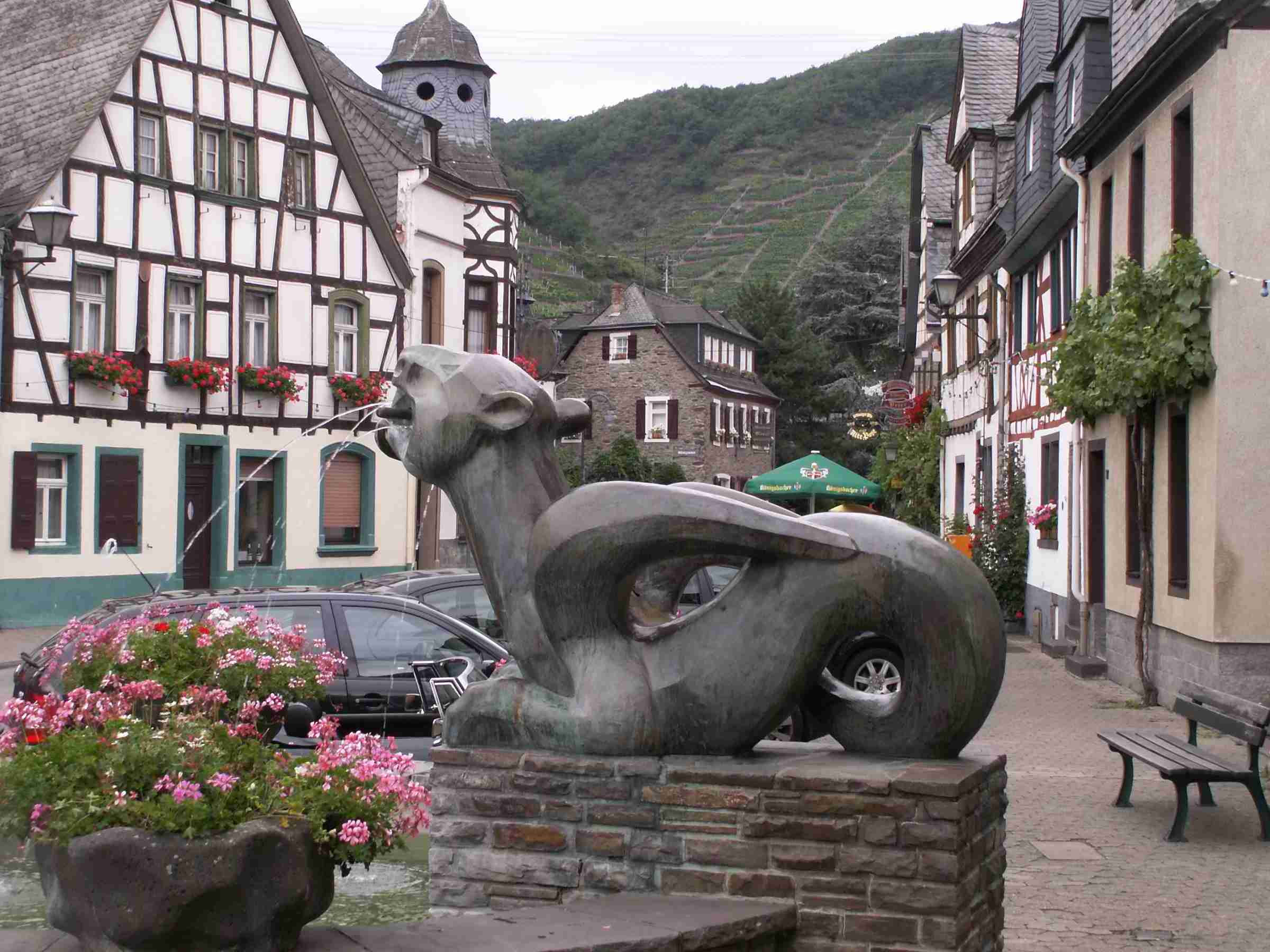
Fountain in Kobern-Gondorf

In the anecdotes, Tatzelwurm or Stollenwurm has been described as resembling a stubby lizard measuring anywhere from 1-3 to 5-7 feet in length. and purportedly either two- or four-legged, or even six-legged. They have been described as having a cat-like face, especially in Switzerland.

The Tatzelwurm of Austria and Bavaria is described as having poison breath, said even to be lethal. The Stollenwurm also has been characterized as poisonous in Swiss lore. Poison, specifically so called "atter", especially "attery breath", is a common trait in European dragons.

The Tatzelwurm also allegedly issues a shrieking sound, whistles or hisses.

=== 17th century accounts ===
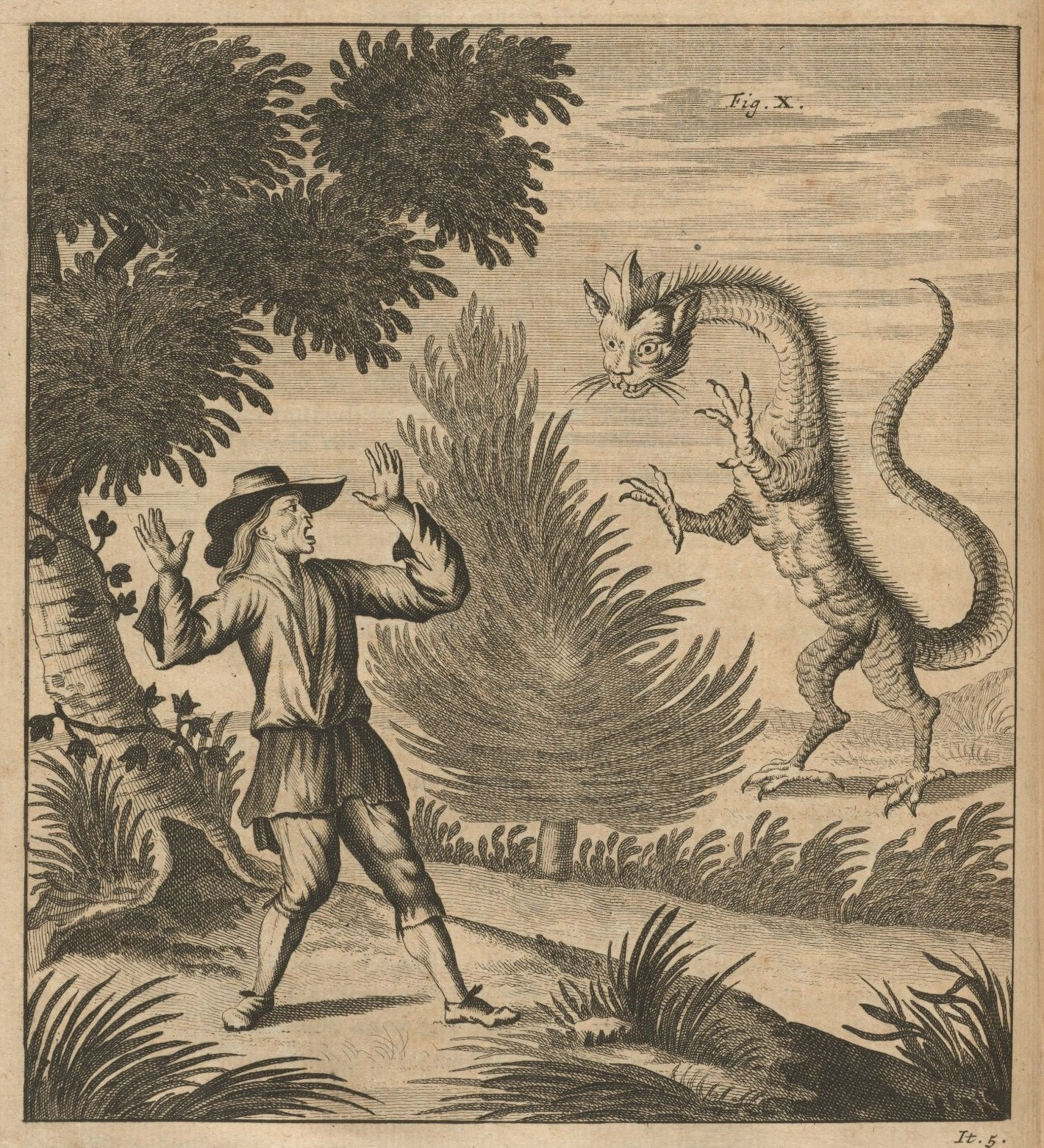
Depiction of the cat-faced "mountain dragon" of the Swiss Alps claimed to have been encountered in Sarganserland, c. 1660.

An early description of dragon (Latin: draco) sightings in Switzerland was given by Johann Jacob Wagner in 1680, and replicated with copperplate illustrations of the beasts by Johann Jakob Scheuchzer in 1723. (Note: Scheuchzer hired a painter to paint the dragons, from which the copperplates were made.) Even though Wagner had been the one to record the testimonies, the creatures were later dubbed "Scheuchzer's dragons", and were interpreted as Stollenwurm sightings by other commentators.

==== The anecdotes ====
An anecdotal "cat-headed serpent" with a black-grey body and no legs (Note: Scheuzer prefaces by mentioning two dragon/serpents for a region, the first being legless: "non pedati", then quoting Wagner: "..vulgo dicito, horrendum serpentem.. caput felis capiti haud dissimile, at pedibus omnino destitutus fuerit". This is translated into German as "förchterliche (schwarz-grüne) Schlange... der Kopf war einem Katzenkopfe nicht unähnlich; sie hatte aber gar keine Füsse". The color, atrogriseum is "black-grey", though the German rendering suggests black-green.) was said to have been encountered by Johann[es] (Hans) and Thomas Tinner (Note: Where it says that Johannes killed the creature "with his brother Thomas Tinner (fratre suo Thoma Tinnero)"'s help, the German renders it as "brother (durch Hülffe seines Bruders)" only.) at a place locally known as "Hauwelen" on the mountain of Frümsen in the Barony of Altsax, Switzerland. (Note: i.e., Herrshaft of Hohensax) It was alleged to measure 7 feet or more in length. Residents in the neighborhood were complaining that their cows' udders were being mysteriously sucked on but the incidents stopped after this creature was killed.

A four-legged, cat-faced "mountain dragon" (Note: The quoted original text from Wagner, "Latin: vulgo dictum.. Draconem Montanum.. quatuor instructus erat pedibus, auribus & facie felis fuit.." indicates the four-legged, cat-eared, cat-faced creature was called colloquially in German by some name meaning "mountain dragon", which "Berg-Drache", but cannot be ascertained to be so, though the German translation of Scheucher gives "Berg-Drache.. Er hatt vier Füsse; das Gesicht un die Ohren waren wie an einer Katze".) was described by one Andreas Roduner as something he encountered in 1660 on Mt. Wangersberg in Sarganserland (Landvogtei of Sargans), and when it reared up on its hind legs it became tall as a man, with boar-like bristles running down its back (pictured right).

A creature like a four-legged lizard with a crest on its head, to give a later naturalist's description, was allegedly seen by Johannes Bueler of Sennwald Parish. A dragon with an enormous head and two forelimbs, was claimed to have been encountered by 70-year-old Johannes Egerter of Lienz on Mt. Kamor; when it exhaled its breath, the man said, he was overcome with headache and dizziness.

==== Later analysis and reception ====
The naturalist Karl Wilhelm von Dalla Torre writing on the "history of dragons of the Alps" in 1887 explained that these creatures could all be identified as species of lizards or snakes (seemingly ignoring the cat-headed features). Dalla Torre considered these giant creatures of the past to have died out by his time, alongside the folk belief associated with them, but that the popular notion of the Tatzelwurm in his day lingered on as a "phantom" of those past legendary creatures.

In contrast, Josef Freiherr von Doblhoff counted these early dragons among his "Tatzelwurm of old and now", the title of his 1896 paper. Although Wagner in the 17th century reported each Swiss monster sighted as a dragon, Studer in the early 19th century stated that the Alpine Swiss locals were generally unfamiliar with the names Drache or Lindwurm and knew only of Stollenwurm.

Scheuchzer has been frequently ridiculed for his credulity in the dragons, evident in the tone of his work. The historian Peter H. Hansen notes however that, in an earlier piece of writing, Scheuchzer expressed skepticism in the material and comments that Newtonian scholars like him in this era had to maintain a posture of open-mindedness regarding nature, and that the modern distinction between "natural" and "supernatural" phenomena cannot strictly be imposed on the developing naturalism of the 18th century.

=== Early 18th and 19th century accounts ===
A 1779 legend describes an encounter with the Tatzelwurm by farmer Hans Fuchs. According to the story, while in the mountains, he allegedly saw two of these creatures in front of him. Frightened for his life, he fled to his home and died of a heart attack from the experience. Supposedly before he died, he told his family of the encounter, describing the creature as 5 to 7 feet in length with a serpent-like body, two clawed front legs and a large feline-like head.

Two Bernese, Samuel Studer (1757–1834) and Johann Rudolf Wyss, (1783–1830) who contributed greatly to Swiss folklore in the early part of the 19th century also added to the knowledge of folklore of the Stollenwurm. Although both authors give expression to the idea that the Stollenwurm (rather than Swiss dragons) have heads that look like cats, this is not to say that actual examples of lore they collected from Alpine people speak of any cat-headed creatures.

==== Samuel Studer ====
The Stollenwurm according to Studer is so called from Stollen meaning "short feet", and were believed to appear after humidly hot weather or when the weather is undergoing volatile change. The people considered them to be poisonous and harmful, and to resemble short, stubby serpents, with a round head similar to a cat's, and clawed feet.

Studer represents perhaps the best source of knowledge on the Stollenwurm available. His contribution to the lore occurred in a short article on insects and the Stollenwurm which appeared inserted in the travelogue of the Franz Niklaus König's travelogue, published in 1814.

Studer's treatise included eyewitness accounts. In 1811, a Stollenwurm with a forked tongue, serpent-like but rather wide head, and two stubby feet was reported by a Schoolmaster Heinrich, (Note: From Dorf, in Guttannen valley.) which he claimed to have seen in Guttannen-tal, Canton Bern, Switzerland. He described it as measuring 1 klafter in length, with a body about the thickness of a man's leg. A few years before, Hans Kehrli from Allmentli in Trachselwald claimed to have killed a quite small, hairy Stollenwurm carrying 10 young.

Studer offered a bounty of 3 to 4 Louis d'or to anyone who could supply him with the remains of an "authentic stollenwurm", indicating the degree of his conviction that the creature existed.

==== Johann Rudolf Wyss ====
The writer Johann Rudolf Wyss, explicitly stated that while the dragon was fabulous, the Stollenwurm was dubious. To the standard description of the Stollenwurm as a sort of snake with a cat's head and short feet, he added it was sometimes said to be hairy, and not just 2 or 4 but multiple limbs like a caterpillar.

Wyss records a fabulous description from a certain shepherd in Gadmen valley who said there were two types of Stollenwurm, white ones with a little crown, and the more common black ones.

Wyss in the estimation of Heinrich Dübi was a less significant source than Studer regarding the folklore of the dragons or Stollenwurm. Something Wyss had done in his commentary is to bring up several pieces of Swiss folklore on snakes, suggesting connections. He conjectured that herdsmen of the Alps were "probably" talking about the Stollenwurm when they said they believed "serpents" had the habit of sucking milk from pasturing cows, which could be warded against by placing a white rooster near the cows. (Note: Wyss identified the source of this lore as Philippe Bridel's work, which was an epitome on Conrad Gessner's description of Mount Pilatus.)

== Swedish analog ==
In the folklore of South Sweden there exist dragons described akin to Tatzelwurm. They belong to a type of dragon which arise when a greedy person who has hidden his money dies. The soul then turns into a terrible, but usually small, dragon and lies on top of the treasure to guard it. Legends say that they resemble lizards or fish, with toothy mouths, claws and long tails, and specifically in southern Sweden, there are stories about such dragons with cat heads.

== See also ==
- Lindworm
- Chinese dragon
- Olm
