= 1C1 3900 =

Class of SNCF electric locomotive

SNCF 1C1 3900 Midi E 3200
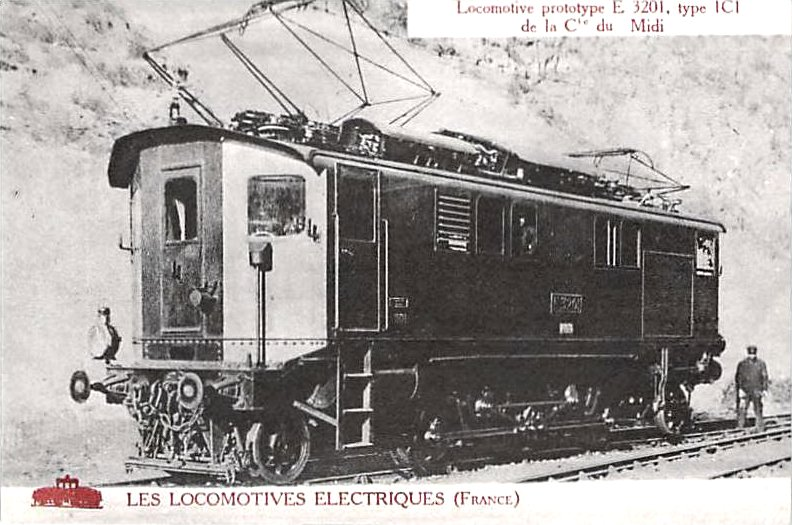
- Midi E 3201
Type and origin
- Power type: Electric
- Builder: Westinghouse
- Build date: 1912
- Total produced: 1
Specifications
- Configuration
  - Whyte: 2-6-2
  - AAR: 1-C-1
  - UIC: 1′C1′
- Gauge: 1,435 mm (4 ft 8 1/2 in) standard gauge
- Wheel diameter: 1,200 mm (47.24 in)
- Trailing dia.: 850 mm (33.46 in)
- Adhesive weight: 54 t (53 long tons; 60 short tons)
- Loco weight: 82 t (81 long tons; 90 short tons)
- Electric system/s: Single phase AC, 12 kV, 16 2/3 Hz. Overhead line
- Current pickup: 2 pantographs
- Traction motors: Two, Westinghouse
Performance figures
- Maximum speed: 75 km/h (47 mph)
- Power output: Continuous, 883 kW (1,184 hp); One hour, 1,030 kW (1,380 hp)

1C1 3900 was a class of SNCF electric locomotive. The class had only one member, 1C1 3901. It was built in 1912 for the Chemins de fer du Midi and its Midi class was E 3200. It was one of six different prototype electric locomotives ordered by the Midi. It was withdrawn in 1959 and one motor from it is preserved.

== Overview ==
Many lines of the Midi network being mountain lines, the company began an electrification programme in 1909. The system chosen was single phase alternating current at 12 kV and 16 2/3 Hz.

Six prototype locomotives were ordered for the Perpignan – Villefranche-de-Conflent line. They were:

- E 3001 from Thomson and General Electric
- E 3101 from AEG and Henschel
- E 3201 from Westinghouse, later SNCF 1C1 3900
- E 3301 from Brown-Boveri and SLM Winterthur
- E 3401 from Ateliers du Nord et de l'Est
- E 3501 from Schneider

Only the E 3201 really worked well. The company also ordered railcars E ABD 1 to 30, which later became Class Z 4900.

== Service ==
The E 3201 worked throughout its career on the Perpignan – Villefranche-de-Conflent line for the haulage of freight trains, helped by the railcars. Thanks to its good reliability, it was kept by the SNCF when it was founded in 1938 and it remained in service until 1959.

== Preservation ==
E 3201 / 1C1 3901 was to be preserved but, owing to an act of vandalism, only one motor from the locomotive could be saved. It is exhibited at the Cité du Train, Mulhouse.
