= SR Class CP =

Class of British electric multiple units

LB&SCR Crystal Palace stock
- Manufacturers: Metropolitan Amalgamated Carriage and Wagon Co. Ltd., LBSC Lancing Carriage Works
- Constructed: 1911–1913
- Number built: 34 sets
- Formation: 3-car sets: DTC-DMBT-DTC
- Capacity: 3-car-set: 48 First, 170 Third

Specifications
- Car length: 57 ft 7 1/2 in (17.56 m)
- Width: 8 ft 0 in (2.44 m)
- Weight: DMBT: 51.30 long tons (52.1 t); DTC: 24 long tons (24.4 t)
- Traction motors: Four Winter Eichberg of 150 hp (112 kW) each
- Power output: 600 hp (447 kW)
- Electric system: 6.7 kV AC overhead line
- Current collection: Bow collector
- UIC classification: 2′2′+B′B′+2′2′
- Track gauge: 4 ft 8 1/2 in (1,435 mm) standard gauge

The Southern Railway (SR) gave the designation CP to the fleet of AC electric multiple units used on the former London, Brighton and South Coast Railway lines in the Crystal Palace area.

== Construction ==
The CP (Crystal Palace stock) units were built in 1911–1913 to provide the electric train stock required for the LBSCR AC overhead electrification to Crystal Palace and the surrounding area. This stock comprised some 90 cars, which were used in three-car formations, usually (Driving Trailer Composite+Driving Motor Brake Third+Driving Trailer Composite).

Thirty motor coaches and 30 driving trailers were built by the Metropolitan Amalgamated Carriage and Wagon Co. Ltd. in 1911. Each motor coach had four 150 horsepower (110 kW) Winter Eichberg motors. A further 26 driving trailers were built at the LBSC's Lancing Carriage Works. In 1912, four additional motor and trailer pairs were delivered by MAC&W's successor, the Metropolitan Carriage, Wagon and Finance Company. Lancing Works built eight more trailers the following year.

After the replacement of the AC overhead equipment by the 660 V DC third rail system adopted as standard by the SR, the carriages that formed these units were rebuilt accordingly.

== Formations ==
The LB&SCR originally did not buy sufficient stock for 30 sets, on the grounds that the trailers cars would be quicker to overhaul than the motor cars. Fixed formations were not used, and as the Motor cars had cabs, the CP stock could be used in trains of two to six vehicles.

Year	Builder	Type	LB&SCR No.	SR No.
1911	MAC&W	DMBT	3231–3260	8567–8595
1911	MAC&W	DTC	4001–4030	9825–9854
1911	Lancing	DTC	4031–4056	9855–9878
1912	MCW&F	DMBT	3261–3264	8597–8600
1911	MAC&W	DTC	4061–4064	9881–9884
1913	Lancing	DTC	4069–4076	9885–9892
