= Repulsion motor =

Type of AC electric motor

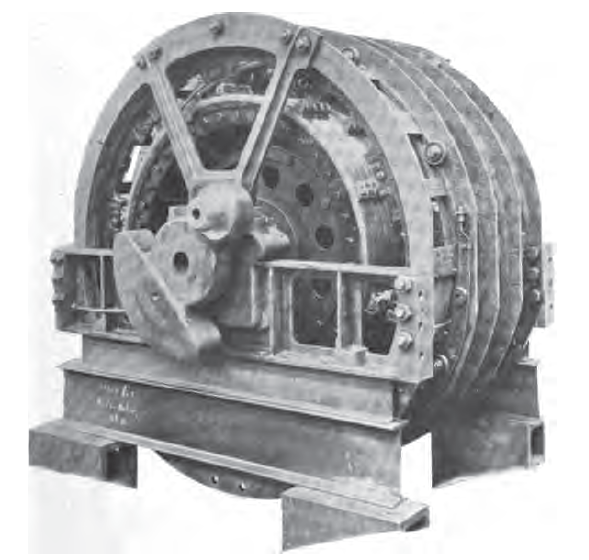
700 horsepower Brown-Boveri-Déri repulsion motor with 10 poles to be used with 12 kV, 16 2/3 Hz single phase current. Two of these motors were used in the French electric locomotive Midi E3301

A repulsion motor is a type of electric motor which runs on alternating current (AC). It was formerly used as a traction motor for electric trains (e.g. SR Class CP and SR Class SL electric multiple units) but has been superseded by other types of motors. Repulsion motors are classified as single phase motors.

In repulsion motors the stator windings are connected directly to the AC power supply and the rotor is connected to a commutator and brush assembly, similar to that of a direct current (DC) motor.

== Construction ==
The motor has a stator and a rotor but there is no electrical connection between the two and the rotor current is generated by induction. The rotor winding is connected to a commutator which is in contact with a short-circuited pair of brushes which can be moved to change their angular position relative to an imaginary line drawn through the axis of the stator. The motor can be started, stopped and reversed, and the speed can be varied, simply by changing the angular position of the brushes.

== Voltage ==
Most commutator motors are limited to about 1,500 volts because higher voltages give rise to a risk of arcing across the commutator. Repulsion motors can be used at higher voltages because the rotor circuit is not electrically connected to the supply.

== Principle ==
Idle	Short-circuit	Position for clockwise operation	Position for counterclockwise operation

Repulsion motors are based on the principle of repulsion between two magnetic fields. Consider a 2-pole salient pole motor with a vertical magnetic axis. The armature is connected to a commutator and brushes. The brushes are short circuited using a low-resistance jumper. When alternating current is supplied to the field (stator) winding, it induces an electromotive force (emf) in the armature. The direction of alternating current is such that it creates a north pole at the top and a south pole at the bottom. The direction of induced emf is given by Lenz's law, according to which the direction of induced emf opposes the cause producing it. The induced emf induces current in the armature conductors and the direction of the induced current depends on the position of the brushes.

=== Stop positions ===
Brush axis parallel to field

If the brush axis is along the direction of the magnetic field, the armature behaves like an electromagnet and an N-pole is formed directly below the N-pole of the stator and an S-pole is formed directly above the S-pole of the stator. The net torque in this condition is zero. Both the N-poles repel each other and both the S-poles repel each other. The two repulsion forces are in direct opposition to each other and hence no torque will be developed. This is very fast process in this repulsion motor.

Brush axis at right angles to field

If the brushes are shifted through 90 degrees, so that the magnetic axis is perpendicular to the brush axis, the coils undergoing short circuit change. Apart from the coils undergoing short circuit, the voltage induced in the other coils between the brush terminals is neutralized and the net voltage is zero. Since there is no induced emf, there is no current in the circuit and the net torque developed is, again, zero.

=== Run positions ===
If the brush axis is displaced at an angle to the magnetic axis, a net voltage is induced at the brush terminals which will produce current in the armature. The current in the armature circuit will produce its own magnetic field, with North and South poles, but in this condition, the North Pole is not directly under the North pole of the magnetic axis and the South Pole is not directly above the South Pole of the magnetic axis. The poles of the armature are slightly displaced from those of the stator. In this condition, the N-pole of the stator field will repel the N-pole of the rotor field and the S-pole of stator field will repel the S-pole of the rotor field, so the rotor starts rotating.

Direction of rotation

The direction of rotation is determined by the position of the brushes with respect to the magnetic field of the stator. If the brushes are shifted clockwise from the main magnetic axis, the motor will rotate in a clockwise direction. If the brushes are shifted counter-clockwise from the main magnetic axis, the motor will rotate in a counter-clockwise direction.

Torque and speed control

The starting torque of a repulsion motor is determined by the angle of brush shift from the main magnetic axis. The maximum torque is obtained from a brush shift of 45 degrees. Brush shift can also be used to control the speed of a repulsion motor.

== Types of repulsion motor ==
Types of repulsion motor are listed below. It is likely that the different types were developed to match the torque/speed characteristics of the motor as closely as possible to the service it was required to provide.

=== Elihu Thomson ===
The Elihu Thomson motor is the original repulsion motor and is described in "Construction" above.

=== Deri ===
Two pole Deri motor

Four pole Deri motor

The Deri motor is similar to the Elihu Thomson type but has two pairs of short-circuited brushes—one fixed and one moveable. This allows very fine control of speed.

=== Latour-Winter-Eichberg ===
This is the "compensated" repulsion motor devised independently by Latour and by Winter-Eichberg. There are, again, two pairs of brushes but they are fixed at right angles to each other. One pair is short-circuited while the other pair is fed with variable-voltage alternating current from tappings on the secondary winding of a small transformer. The primary winding of the transformer is in series with the stator winding of the motor. This motor has the same torque/speed characteristics as an ordinary series-wound motor.

=== Atkinson ===
The Atkinson motor has two stator coils at right angles to each other. Speed control (by brush-shifting) is possible from 75% below synchronous speed to 10% above. Starting torque is about 2.5 times full-load torque with twice full-load current.

=== Repulsion-start induction-run ===
These were used where high starting torque was required. They started as repulsion motors, but once they were running at a sizable fraction of full speed, the brushes were lifted mechanically and all commutator bars were short-circuited together to create the equivalent of a squirrel-cage induction motor.

== Applications ==
Repulsion motor applications included:

- High speed lifts
- Electrical locomotives
- Fans and pumps
- Printing presses
- Textile machines
- Film winding machines (smooth manual speed and direction adjustment could be achieved without complicated circuitry)

== See also ==
- AC motor
- Electric motor
- Universal motor
