= Type 032 T =

Class of French 0-6-4 Engerth locomotive

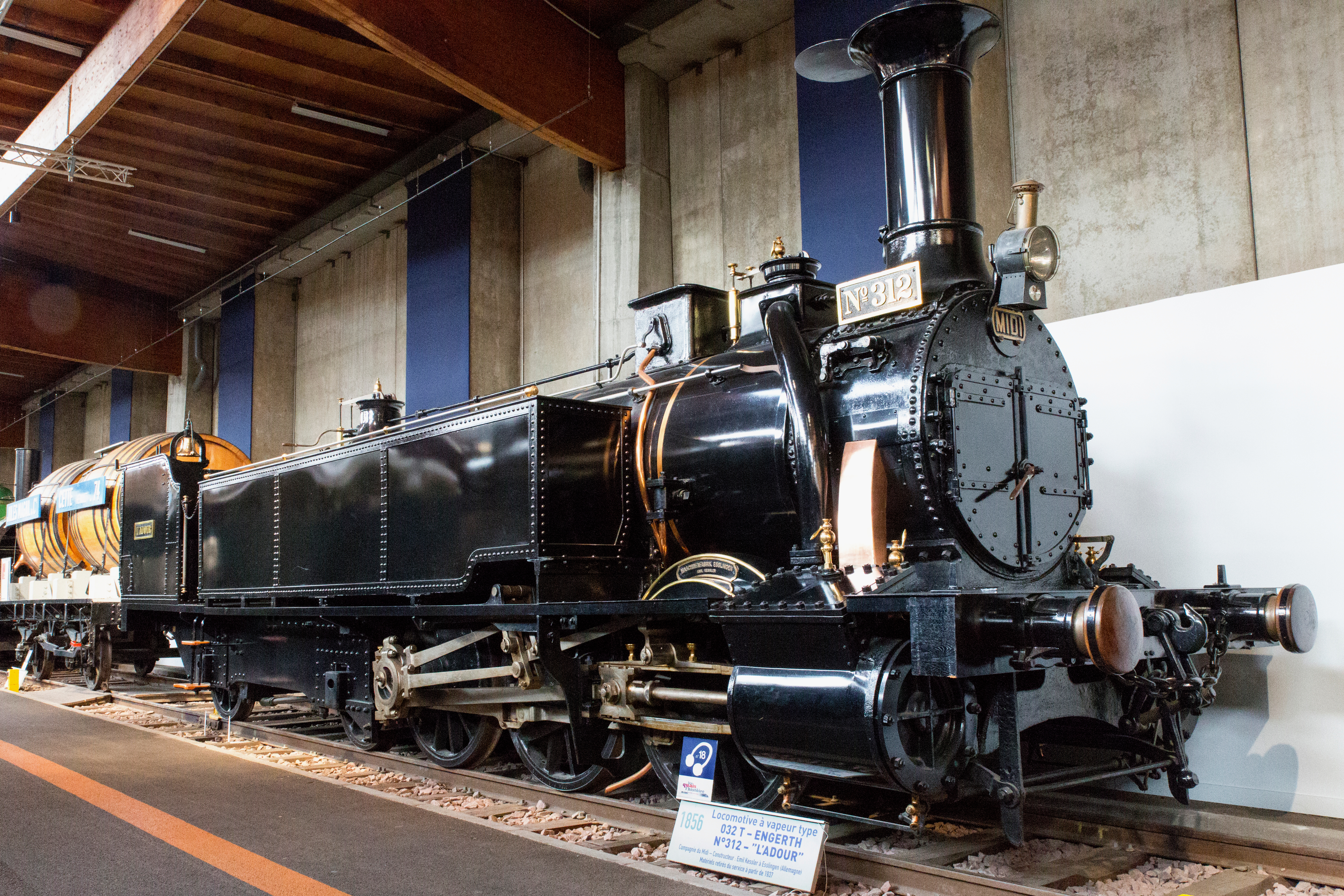
Midi 312 "L'Adour" at Cité du Train

The Type 032 T is a class of steam locomotives, first used on the Chemins de fer du Midi, that were still in service when the SNCF was founded. The units had several designations during their careers (Midi 312 → PO-Midi 032-312 → SNCF 4–032.TA.312).

While in service with the Chemins de fer du Midi, they were classified as Midi Class 032, numbered 308–344. Built by Emil Kessler of the Maschinenfabrik Esslingen, with a delivery date from 1855 to 1858, the railway made several modifications to the units over their lifetimes. Notably, they added Westinghouse air brakes, an enclosed cabin and a new boiler to about half of the units.

Locomotives 312, 316 et 329 became 4.032 TA numbers 312, 316 et 329 with the SNCF, working out of the depots at Mende and Sévérac. They were struck from the register in 1940. One example, a locomotive named L’Adour , has been preserved at Cité du train, being one of the models without an enclosed cabin. The unit is featured in the 19th century portion of Les Quais de l'Histoire (THE PLATFORMS OF HISTORY) section of the museum.
