= John of Jandun =

French philosopher, theologian and political writer (c. 1285–1328)

John of Jandun or John of Jaudun (French Jean de Jandun, Johannes von Jandun, Joannes Gandavensis, or Johannes de Janduno, circa 1285–1328) was a French philosopher, theologian, and political writer. Jandun is best known for his outspoken defense of Aristotelianism and his influence in the early Latin Averroist movement.

== Life ==
Jandun was born in Reims, in the Champagne region of France, between 1280 and 1289, though the exact date is unknown. It is likely that he grew up in the small town of Jandun (modern day Signy-l'Abbaye).

Jandun is known to have become a member of the arts faculty in Paris by 1310, likely by as early as 1307. While a professor in Paris, Jandun was well informed and involved with theological debates. In 1315 Jandun became an original member of the faculty at the College of Navarre and was in charge of 29 students. In 1316 Pope John XXII awarded Jandun a canonry of Senlis, and it is likely that he spent time there, though he continued to teach in Paris for the next ten years.

Jandun identified closely with Marsilius of Padua, another Latin Averroist who was rector at the university in Paris from 1312 to 1313. Marsilius presented Jandun with a copy of Pietro d'Abano's commentary on the problems of Aristotle.

On 19 June 1324 Jandun was involved in a business transaction to rent a house for life. Four days later Marsilius finished the Defensor Pacis. When it became known in 1326 that Marsilius had authored the Defensor Pacis, he and Jandun fled together to the court of Louis IV of Bavaria. Pope John XXII began issuing condemnations against Jandun from 6 September 1326 and finally excommunicated Jandun on 23 October 1327 as a heretic.

Jandun accompanied Louis IV to Italy, and was present in Rome on 1 May 1328 when Louis IV was crowned Holy Roman Emperor. Louis appointed Jandun as Bishop of Ferrara. Ten weeks later Jandun was formally accepted as a member of Louis IV's court, and was given indefinite rations for three servants and three horses. Later that summer, around 31 August 1328, Jandun died in Todi, most likely en route to his new bishopric.

== Works ==
Jandun is best known for his work on the agens sensus, the principle of individuation, and the priority of universal knowledge to particular knowledge. He also wrote on the theory of the vacuum, plurality of forms, form and matter, the soul, the intellect, as well as other topics relating to Aristotle. Because of his closeness to Marsilius of Padua, Jandun is often incorrectly credited with authoring or coauthoring the Defensor pacis. It is now generally accepted that he did not write it, but it is possible that Jandun advised Marsilius on the work.

Jandun's works first appeared in manuscript beginning with a short quaestio in 1314, though he may have begun writing as early as 1310 or 1307. He is also the author of an encomnium to Paris (Tractatus de laudibus parisius), written in 1323, which gives a description of that city in the fourteenth century. Printed editions of his works include:

- Quaestiones super tres libros Aristotelis de Anima. Venetiis: F. de Hailbrun & N. de Franckfordia socios, 1483.
- Questiones magistri Joannis Dullaert a gandavo in librum predicabilium Prphirii secumdum duplicem viam nominalium et realium inter se bipartitarum annesiis aliquos questionibus et difficultatibus Joannis Drabbe Bonicollii Gandensis. Parisiis: apud Prigentium Calvarin, in clauso Brunello, 1528.
- Questiones magistri Ioannis Dullaert a gandavo in librum predicamemtorum Aristotelis; Secundum viam nominalium nunc. Parisiis: apud Prigentium Calvarin, 1528.
- In libros Aristotelis De coelo et mundo quae extant quaestiones subtilissimae, quibus nuper consulto adjecimus Averrois : sermonem de substantia orbis, cum ejusdem Joannis commentario ac quaestionibus. Venetiis: Juntas, 1552.
- Quaestiones in duodecim libros Metaphysicae. Venetiis, 1553. New edition, Frankfurt: Minerva, 1966.
- Super libros Aristotelis de anima. Venetiis, 1480, 1587 . New edition: Frankfurt: Minerva, 1966.
- Quaestiones super 8 libros Physicorum Aristotelis. New edition: Frankfurt: Minerva, 1969.

== Legacy ==
Jandun's work carried the Latin Averroist tradition from Paris to Bologna, Padua, and Erfurt in the 14th century, and Kraków in the 15th century. Jandun tended toward the views of Aristotle, but was not afraid to follow an idea to its logical conclusion. Many of his views were uncommon and controversial, and were not received well by the Catholic Church. Manuscripts and printed editions influenced the Latin Averroist movement until the time of Galileo.
