= Tschanz drive =

Swiss electric locomotive drive

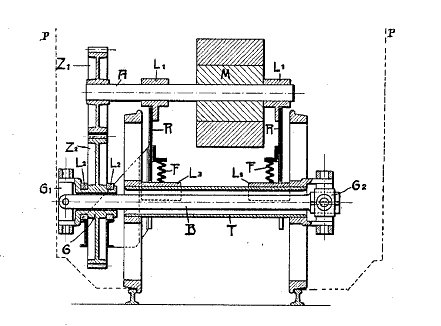
Tschanz single axle drive system (US patent drawing)

The Tschanz drive or Oerlikon single-axle drive is a fully sprung single-axle drive for electric locomotives named after its inventor Otto Tschanz or after Maschinenfabrik Oerlikon. The drive was not widely used because its competitor, the Buchli drive, was cheaper and lighter.

== Construction ==
The Tschanz drive is a fully sprung drive, which means that the motors are housed in the sprung part of the locomotive and are thus less exposed to shocks from the rails. Also, the shocks from the wheelsets to the rail are reduced because there is less unsprung weight on them.

The traction motor is firmly mounted in the locomotive frame and drives through a single-stage gearbox to a gear that is located to one side of the wheel, but the wheel can move with the locomotive suspension relative to the gear. The power transmission from this gear to the axle is done with a long cardan shaft from one side to the other, passing through a hollow axle.

== Use ==
Rolling stock on which the Tschanz drive was used include:

- SBB-CFF-FFS Be 2/5
- SBB-CFF-FFS Ae 4/8
- BTB BCe 2/5
- PLM 242 BE 1
- PLM 262 AE

== Patents ==
- Drive device on railway vehicles with motors firmly mounted on the spring-loaded frame, (1916).
- Motor mechanism for railway vehicles, with electric motors rigidly fixed to the frame mounted on suspension springs, (1917).
- Driving mechanism for railway-vehicles with electric motors rigidly mounted on spring-supported frames, (1919).

== See also ==
- Quill drive
- Winterthur universal drive
