= Marc Bridel =

French pharmacist and chemist

Marc Bridel (15 May 1883 – 11 December 1931) was a French pharmacist and chemist born in Blois.

From 1906 he worked as an assistant to Émile Bourquelot (1851-1921) in the laboratory of pharmaceutical technology at the Ecole de pharmacie in Paris. In 1911 he obtained his doctorate in pharmacy, followed by his degree in sciences in 1913. From 1926 to 1931 he was chair of plant physics at the Muséum national d'histoire naturelle.

Bridel is credited with the isolation of a number of new glucosides, and with Émile Bourquelot, he isolated verbascose, a new sugar extracted from the roots of Verbascum thapsus.

In addition he performed research of enzymes (invertin, rhamnodiastase) and enzyme mixtures (emulsin); did a study of sirop de gomme (gum syrup) and conducted investigations on the activity of certain glucosides in plant color changes during desiccation.

He was the author of 175 scientific articles, of which 55 were co-written with Émile Bourquelot. From 1920 to 1927 he was editor of the Bulletin de la Société de Chimie Biologique.
