= Bridle path (disambiguation) =

A bridle path is a path or trail for horses.

Bridle path or bridal path may also refer to:

- Bridal Path (novel), a 1952 novel by Nigel Tranter
  - The Bridal Path (film), a 1959 British comedy film based on the novel
- Bridle path (horse), a cropped section of a horse's mane
- Bridle Path (New Zealand), a track connecting Christchurch and Lyttelton on the South Island of New Zealand
- Bridle Path, Simi Valley, California, a residential community
- Bridle Path, Toronto, a residential neighbourhood in Toronto, Canada
- Bridle Path, a 1939 painting by Edward Hopper
