= Émile Bourquelot =

French chemist and professor of pharmacy

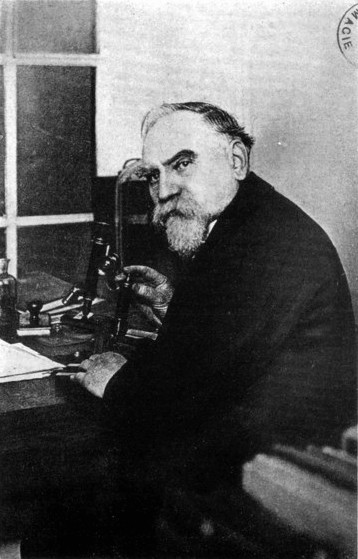
Élie-Émile Bourquelot

Émile Bourquelot (21 June 1851 – 26 January 1921) was a French chemist, and professor of pharmacy at the University of Paris. He was born in Jandun (Ardennes, France), to a farmer, and was the eldest of three sons. Bourquelot became the Chief Pharmacist at the Laënnec Hospital in 1887, where he established a laboratory to conduct his research into carbohydrate chemistry. Bourquelot and other French pharmacists pioneered the study of plant glycosides, molecules in which a sugar is bound to a non-carbohydrate part. They developed methods to stabilize these compounds in solution, and detect them enzymatically. He died at the age of 70 on 26 January 1921 of pneumonia.

The French Academy of Sciences awarded him the Prix Montagne for 1897.
