= Jandun =

- Commune
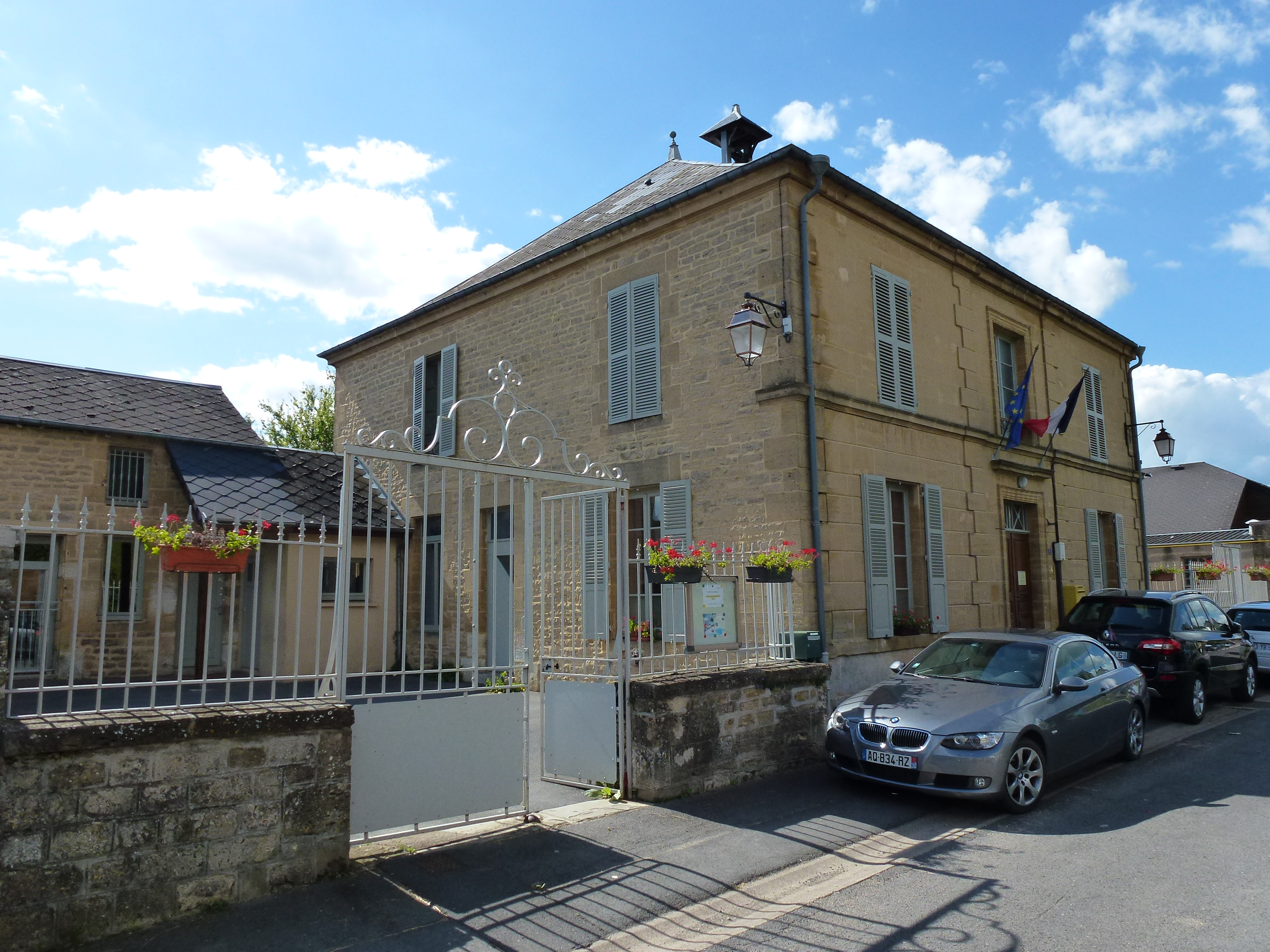
- Town hall

- Coat of arms
- Location of Jandun
- Location within France Location within Grand Est
- Coordinates: 49°39′50″N 4°33′27″E
- Country: France
- Region: Grand Est
- Department: Ardennes
- Arrondissement: Charleville-Mézières
- Canton: Signy-l'Abbaye
- Intercommunality: Crêtes Préardennaises

Government
  - Mayor (2020–2026): François Garcia
- Area^{1}: 12.78 km^{2} (4.93 sq mi)
- Elevation: 340 m (1,120 ft)
- Population (2023): 293
  - Density: 22.9/km^{2} (59.4/sq mi)
- Time zone: UTC+01:00 (CET)
  - Summer (DST): UTC+02:00 (CEST)
- INSEE/Postal code: 08236 /08430
- ^{1} French Land Register data, which excludes lakes, ponds, glaciers > 1 km^{2} (0.386 sq mi or 247 acres) and river estuaries.

Jandun (French pronunciation: [ʒɑ̃dœ̃]) is a commune in the Ardennes department in northern France.

"Romy" mineral water is produced here.

== Population ==
Historical population
Year	Pop.	±% p.a.
1968	230	—
1975	206	−1.56%
1982	230	+1.59%
1990	242	+0.64%
1999	235	−0.33%
2007	265	+1.51%
2012	285	+1.47%
2017	285	+0.00%
2023	293	+0.46%
Source: INSEE

== Sights and monuments ==
- The church, Notre-Dame de Jandun, dates from the 12th and 13th centuries. It has 19th century frescoes, a Baroque altar and some sculpted capitals. Stained glass and statues decorate the interior.
- In the grounds of the church is a sculpted stone cross, classified as a monument historique in 1963 by the French Ministry of Culture.
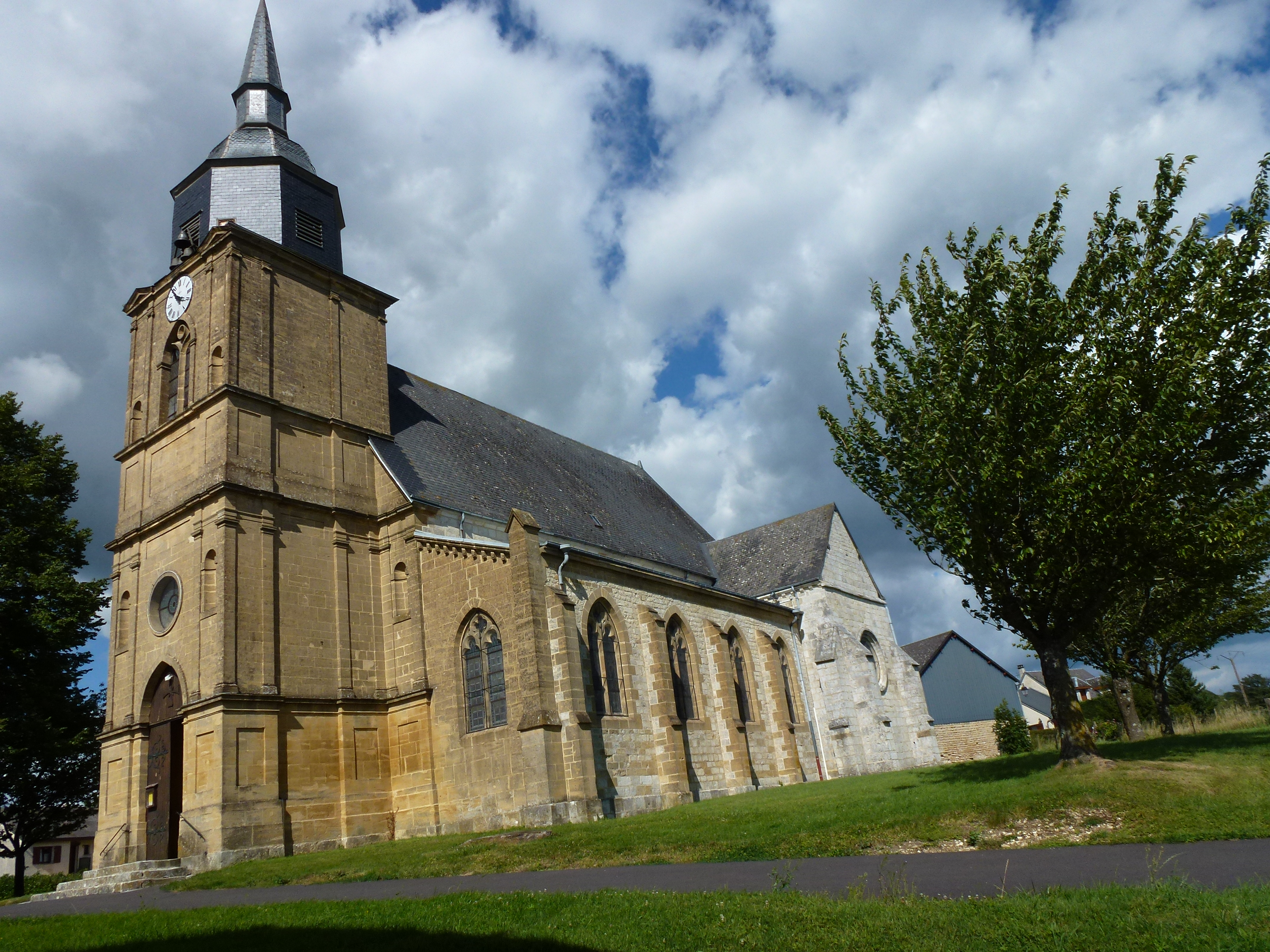
Notre-Dame church

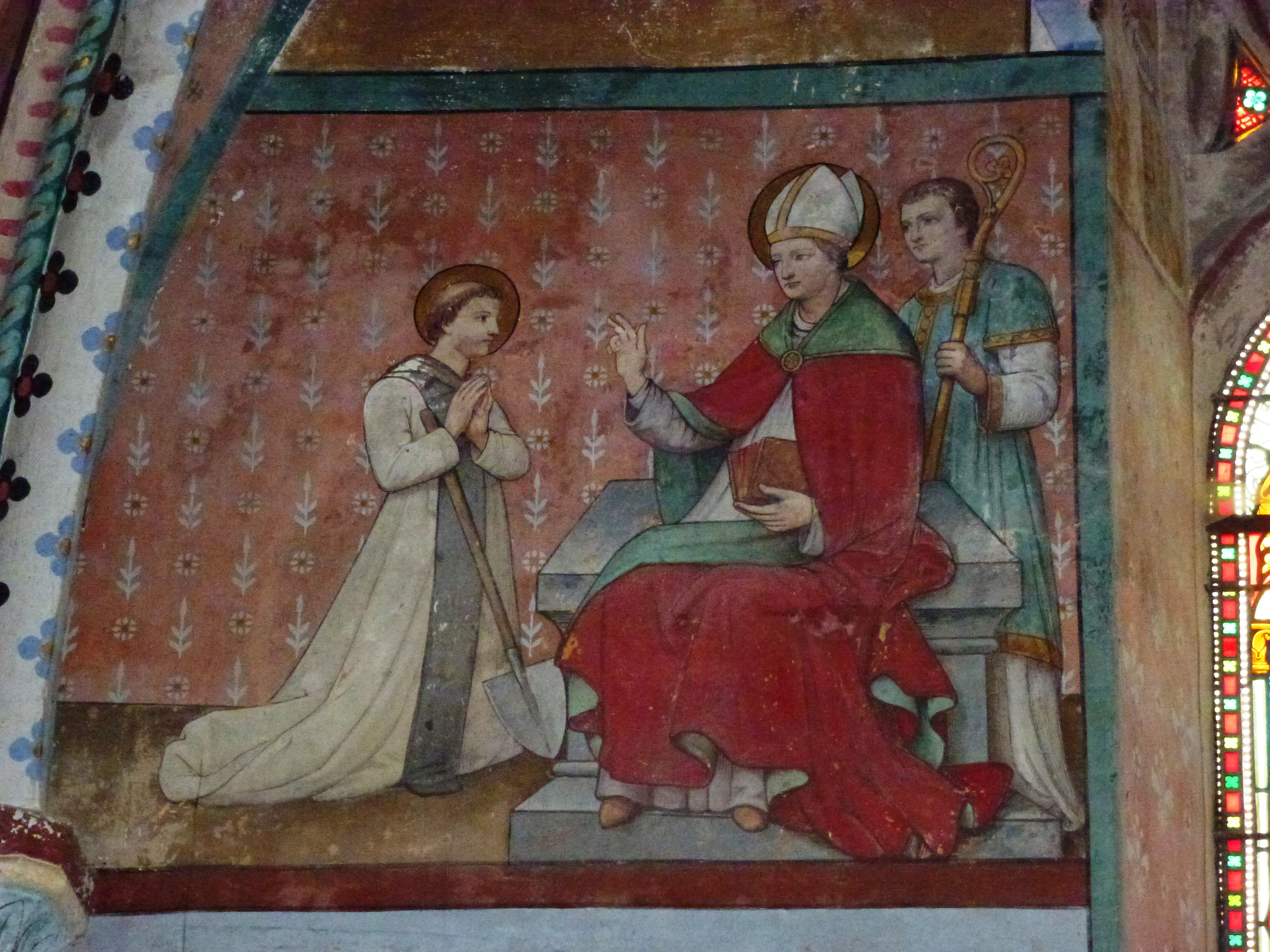
Fresco of Saint Fiacre

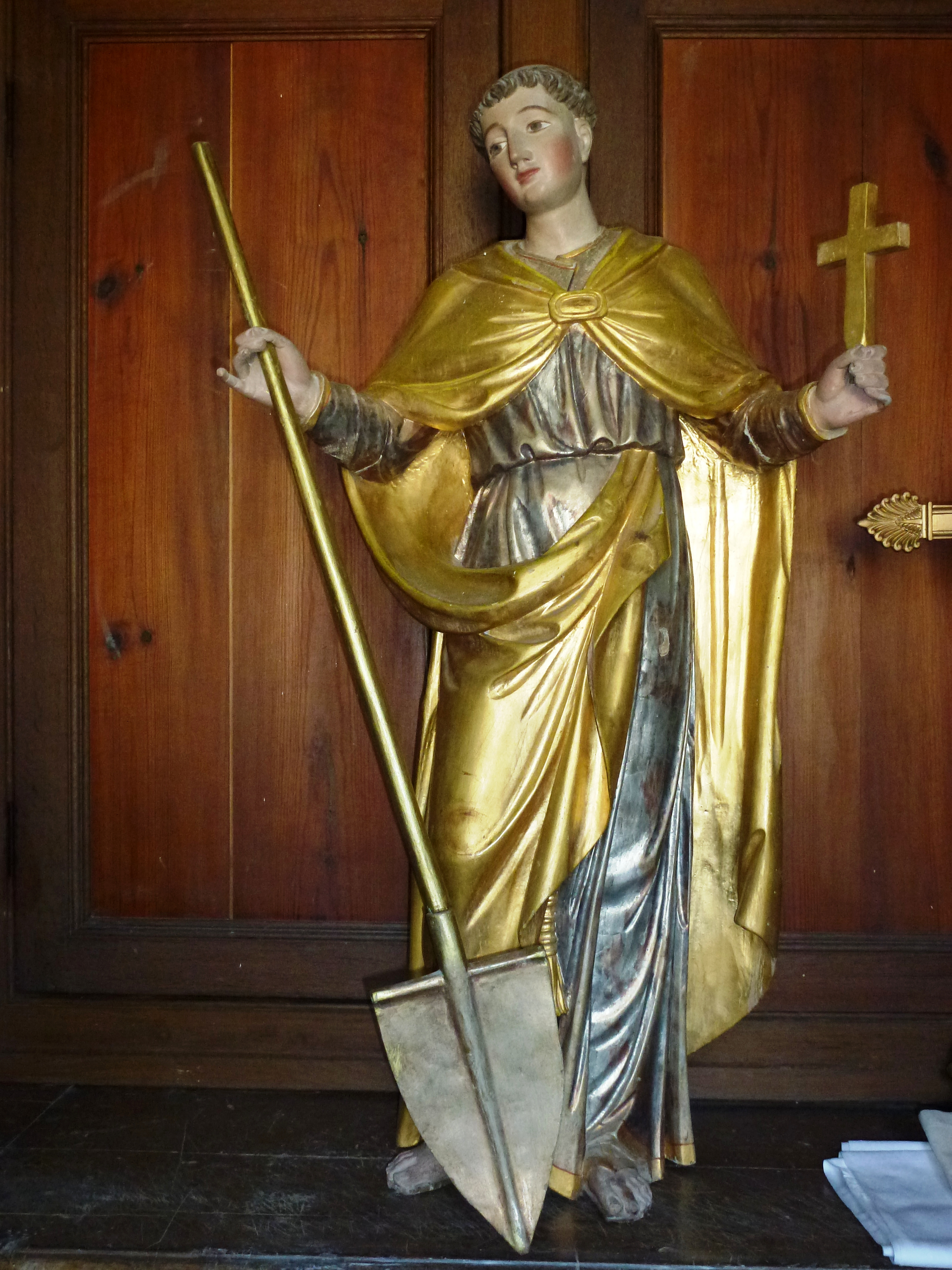
Statues of Saint Fiacre

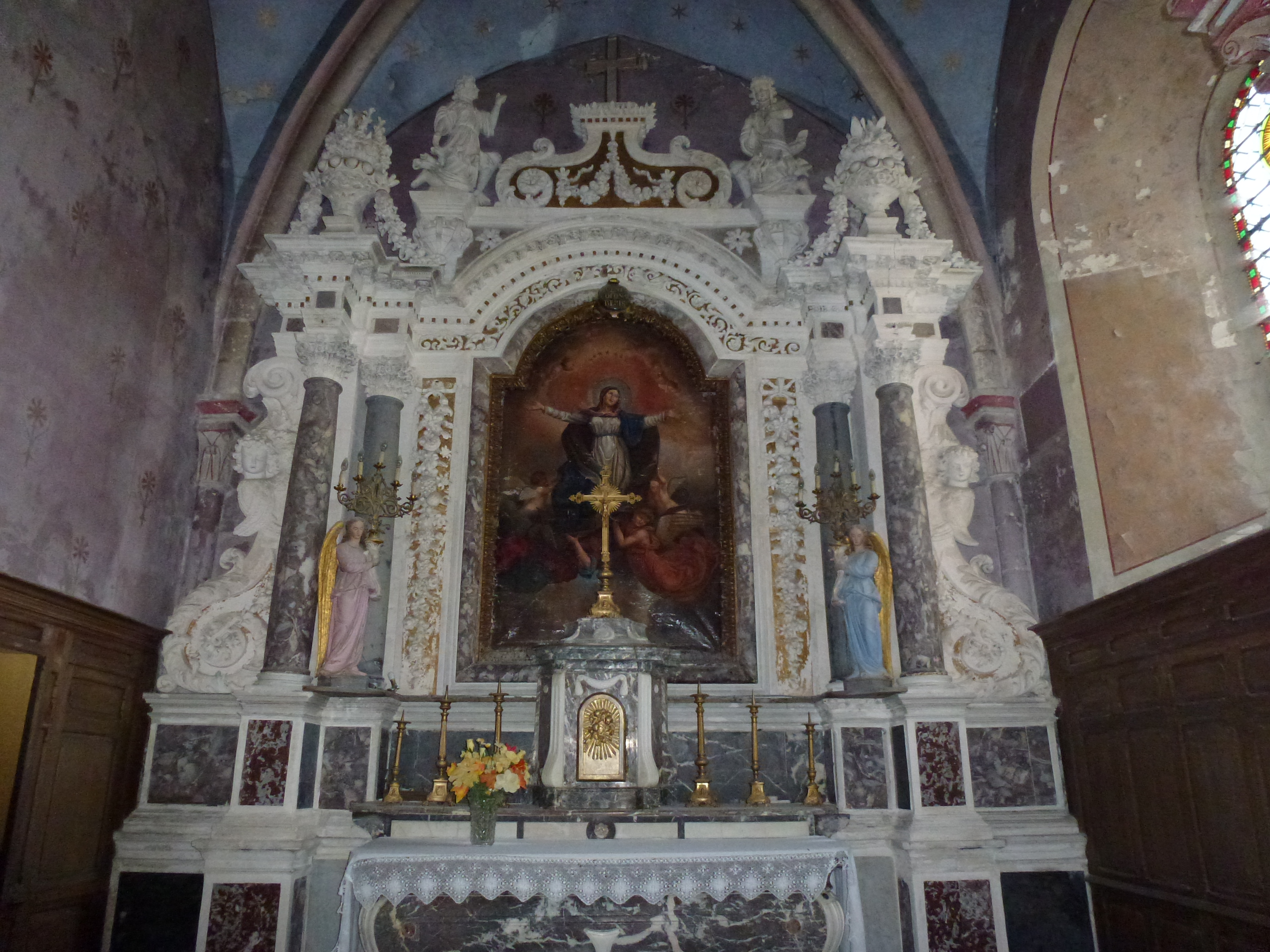
The Baroque altar

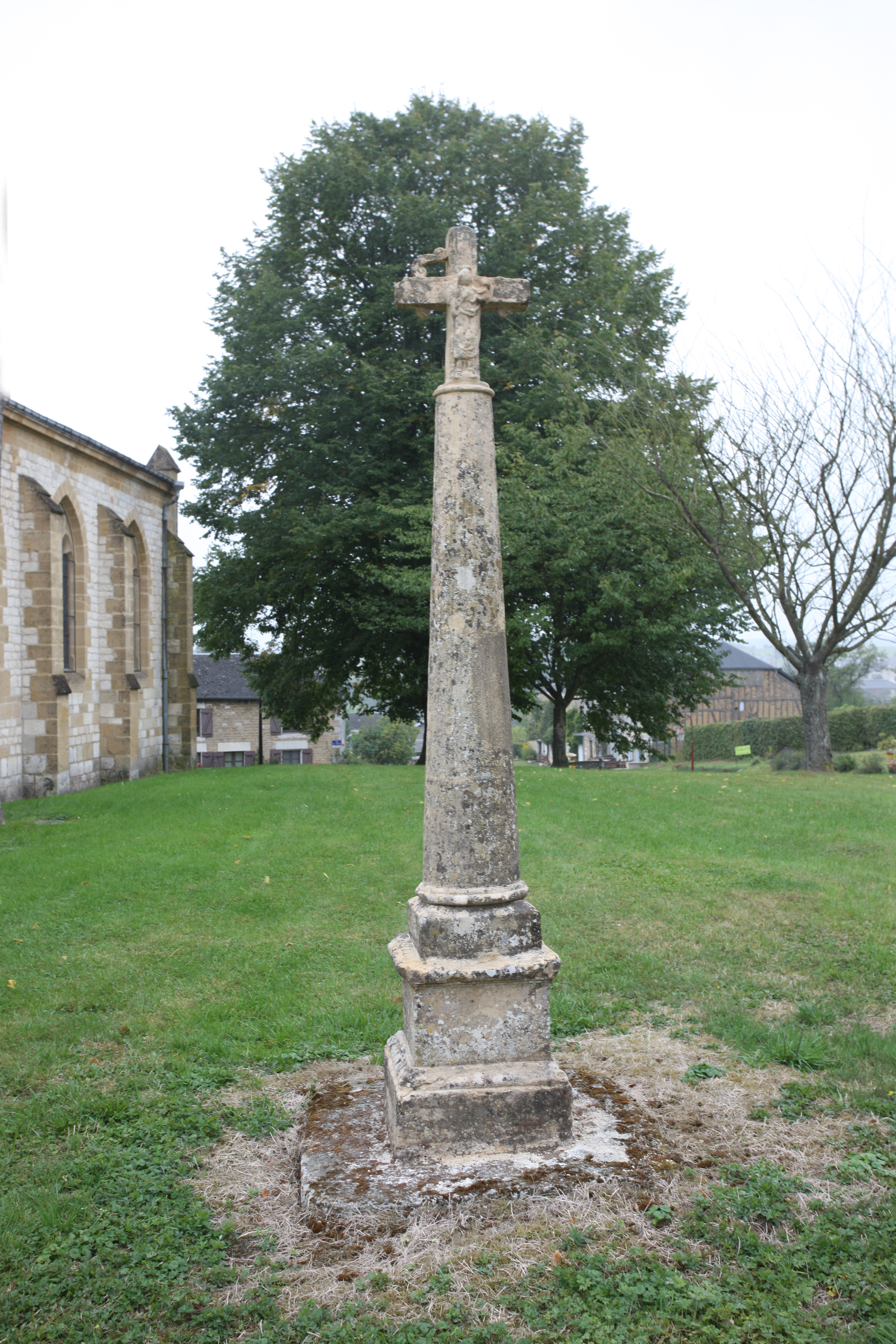
Sculpted cross

== People linked to the commune ==
- Jean de Jandun (circa 1285–1323) was a French philosopher, theologian, and political writer.
- The Duhan family, lords of part of Jaudun :
  - Jean Duhan, counsellor to the king.
  - Jacques Égide du Han (1685–1746), also known as Jacques Égide Duhan de Jandun, Huguenot soldier who served for twelve years as tutor to Frederick the Great.
- Émile Bourquelot, born in Jandun on 21 June 1851, chemist and professor of pharmacy.

== See also ==
- Communes of the Ardennes department
