= Doyen Bridel =

Swiss writer

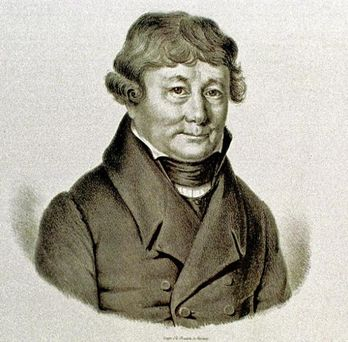
Philippe Bridel (1757-1845), Swiss writer and poet.

Philippe-Sirice Bridel (also Philippe Cyriaque), known as le Doyen Bridel (20 November 1757 – 20 May 1845) was a man of letters, advocate of Swiss folklore, active during the development of Swiss national identity.

== Biography ==
Bridel was born on 20 November 1757 in Begnins. He served as a pastor at Basel, Château-d'Oex and Montreux. He began writing poetry in 1782 and is considered the earliest Vaudois poets by virtue of his Poèsies helvtiennes (1782). He is known for his work on Swiss history and linguistics, specifically for his glossary of the patois of French-speaking Switzerland, published posthumously in 1866. However he is better known as the painter of the scenery and people among whom he worked as pastor.

Bridel's Course de Bâle à Bienne par les vallées du Jura appeared in 1802, while descriptions of his travels, as well as of the manners of the natives, local history, and in short everything that could stimulate national sentiment, were issued in a series of periodicals from 1783 to 1831 under the successive titles of Etrennes helvétiennes and of Conservateur suisse. His patriotic aim met with great success, while his impressions of his mountain wanderings are fresh and unspoilt by any straining after effect.

Bridel was the first writer of the Suisse Romande to undertake such wanderings, so that, with obvious differences, he may be regarded not merely as the forerunner, but as the inspirer and model of later Vaudois travellers and climbers in the Alps, such as Rodolphe Töpffer, of Eugène Rambert, and Rambert's pupil, Émile Javelle (1844–1883), whose articles were collected in 1886 by his friends under the title of Souvenirs d'un alpiniste.

Bridel died on 20 May 1845 in Montreux, at the age of 87.

== Bibliography ==
- 1789, Course de Bale a Bienne
- 1791, Mélanges Hélvétiques Des Années 1787–1790
- 1866, Glossaire du patois de la Suisse romande (ed. Louis Favrat)
