= SBB Ae 6/6 =

Swiss electric locomotive

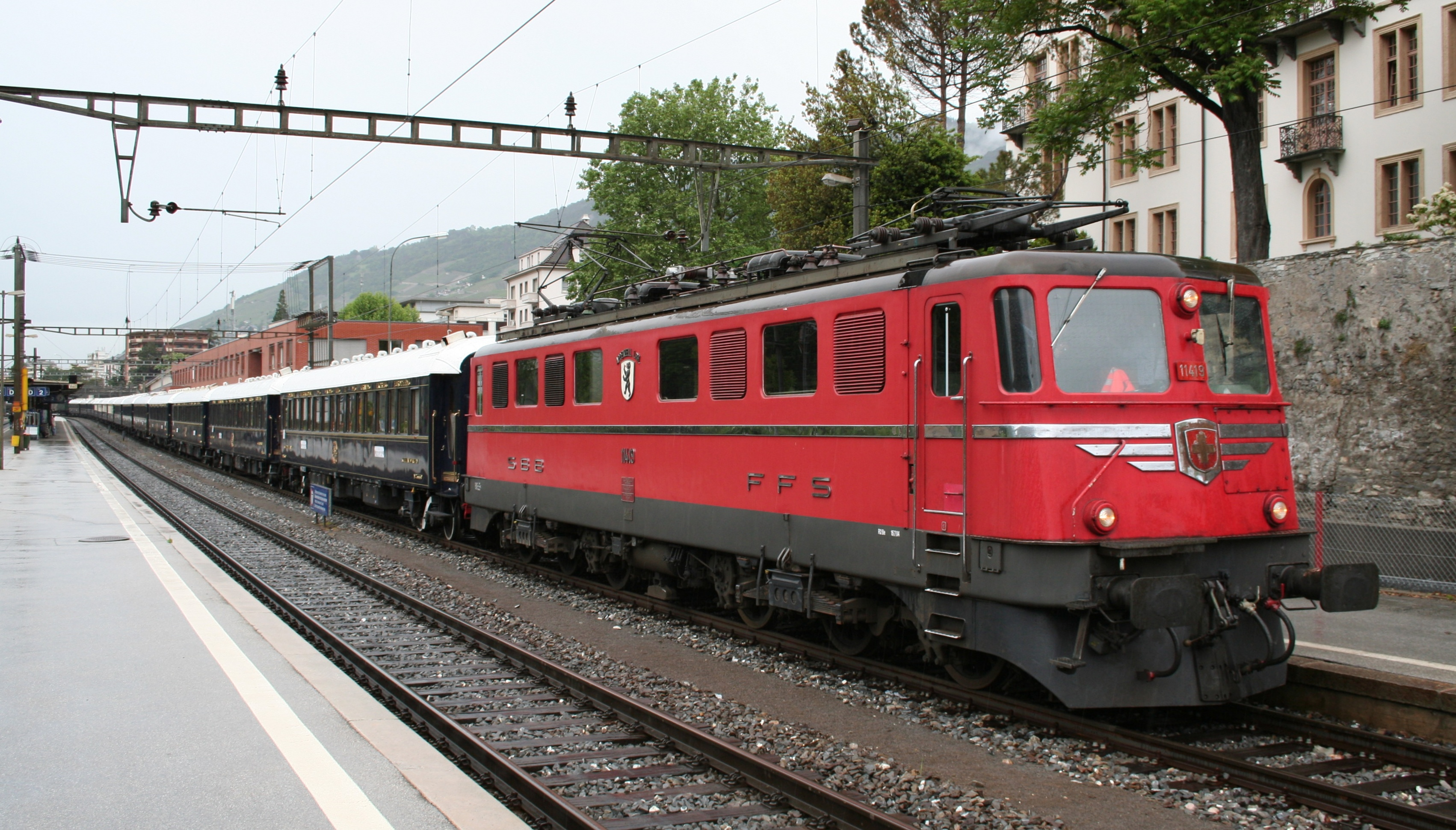
- Ae 6/6 11419 "Appenzell Innerrhoden" in Sierre
Type and origin
- Power type: Electric
- Builder: SLM Winterthur; BBC Baden; MFO Zürich
- Build date: 1952, 1955–1966
- Total produced: 120
Specifications
- Configuration
  - UIC: Co′Co′
- Gauge: 1,435 mm (4 ft 8 1/2 in) standard gauge
- Length: 18,400 mm (60 ft 4 3/8 in)
- Width: 2,970 mm (9 ft 8 7/8 in)
- Height: 4,500 mm (14 ft 9 1/8 in)
- Loco weight: Prototypes: 124 tonnes (122 long tons; 137 short tons), Production: 120 tonnes (118.1 long tons; 132.3 short tons)
- Electric system/s: 15 kV 16 2/3 Hz AC Catenary
- Current pickup: Pantograph
Performance figures
- Maximum speed: 125 km/h (78 mph), later 120 km/h (75 mph)
- Power output: 4,300 kW (5,770 hp)
- Tractive effort: Starting: 392 kN (88,130 lbf), Continuous: 221 kN (49,680 lbf)
Career
- Operators: Swiss Federal Railways
- Number in class: 2005: 110
- Numbers: 11401–11520, later Ae 610 000 – Ae 610 119
- Retired: 2013

The Ae 6/6 is a class of heavy electric locomotive used by the Swiss Federal Railways (SBB). It is sometimes also referred to as "canton locomotive" (German: Kantonslokomotive), because the first 25 locomotives (a 26th was renamed after the separation of Jura) were named after the cantons of Switzerland and carried the canton's coat of arms on the side and chrome embellishments (a single raised stripe on each side and three raised stripes on each end), and the Swiss coat of arms on the front, between the chrome stripes. These adornments made them internationally famous. The other 95 (94) locomotives received the names of capital cities of Swiss cantons, and other towns and cities, but without the chrome embellishments. The namings were held as ceremonies in the respective cities. A less flattering moniker is Schienenwolf (lit. 'railroad plough') as the three axle bogie construction stresses the tracks heavily.

Originally designed for heavy services on the Gotthard route, as many Swiss locomotives were, the Ae 6/6 was one of the classic Gotthard locomotives.

All locomotives were originally painted in the SBB CFF FFS green livery, with the number, and either SBB CFF, or SBB FFS on each side, all raised numerals in chrome. Nowadays, about half are painted red, and a proportion of the fleet have been repainted in SBB Cargo livery, with all raised chrome embellishments removed apart from the Swiss coat of arms on each end. These locomotives have been renumbered (as class Re 610) in line with the current Swiss numbering scheme.

== History ==
Before the advent of the Ae 6/6, trains on the Gotthard route were hauled mainly by Ae 4/6, Ae 4/7 and Be 6/8 ("crocodile"), which were underpowered by contemporary standards. This led to many trains needing bank engines on the Gotthard ramps, and adding them was a tedious, uneconomical and impractical procedure.

== Demands on the Ae 6/6 ==
SBB needed a more powerful locomotive. The specification, created in 1949, included that the locomotive to be developed must be able the pull a 600 tonne train over the 26‰ gradients of the Gotthard line at 75 km/h (47 mph). The first prototype with the number 11401 was scheduled for delivery in 1952.

== Experiences with the prototypes ==
Intense trial runs were made with the prototypes. They had bogies with fixed axles, which led to heavy rail and wheel flange abrasion. Despite some early technical issues, the SBB were convinced they were on the right path with the development of the Ae 6/6. After introducing side-elastic wheelsets and making the wheel flanges of the middle axles smaller, the series production started in 1954, resulting in the first series locomotives delivered in 1955.

== Operations until the 1960s ==
=== Summary ===
In its heyday, the 1950s and 1960s, the Ae 6/6 was the Gotthard locomotive par excellence, both for passenger and freight traffic. They were also used on the route through the Simplon tunnel. They were used in turns to ensure regular servicing in the main maintenance facility at Bellinzona. In the late 1960s, the two prototypes were retired from service on the Gotthard line; gradually followed by the rest of the class. After the introduction of the Re 6/6 locomotives, most Ae 6/6 were reallocated to services in the Swiss Plateau. Subsequently, they were mostly used for freight trains, because they are too slow for the faster passenger services. An exception were those units hired by the BLS, which were sometimes used to haul relief and intercity trains over the Lötschberg route.

=== The prototypes ===
The locomotive 11401 was delivered in 1952, and put on test runs. 11402 was completed in 1953. They were tested in a two-day programme on the Gotthard route, where they ran up to 900 km (560 mi) in one day. Temporarily, however, there were one or two of the six motors broken, which were replaced by ballast to keep the correct weight. The locomotives with broken motors where then used in services normally run by the less powerful Ae 4/7.

The series locomotives 11403-11520 were delivered from 1955 to 1966. They first replaced the Ae 4/7 and later the newer Ae 4/6.

For about 20 years, practically all heavy freight and passenger trains on the Gotthard route were hauled by this locomotive.

=== Numbering and namings ===
Locomotive namings were a feature introduced to Switzerland with the Ae 6/6, a custom adopted from Britain. All Ae 6/6 were decorated with a coat of arms, either of one of the 26 cantons or a Swiss commune. They were grand events at the time, and every canton was proud to get its "own" Ae 6/6. Locomotives 11426 to 11520 got coats of arms of communes. Only those with canton names had additional chrome embellishments.

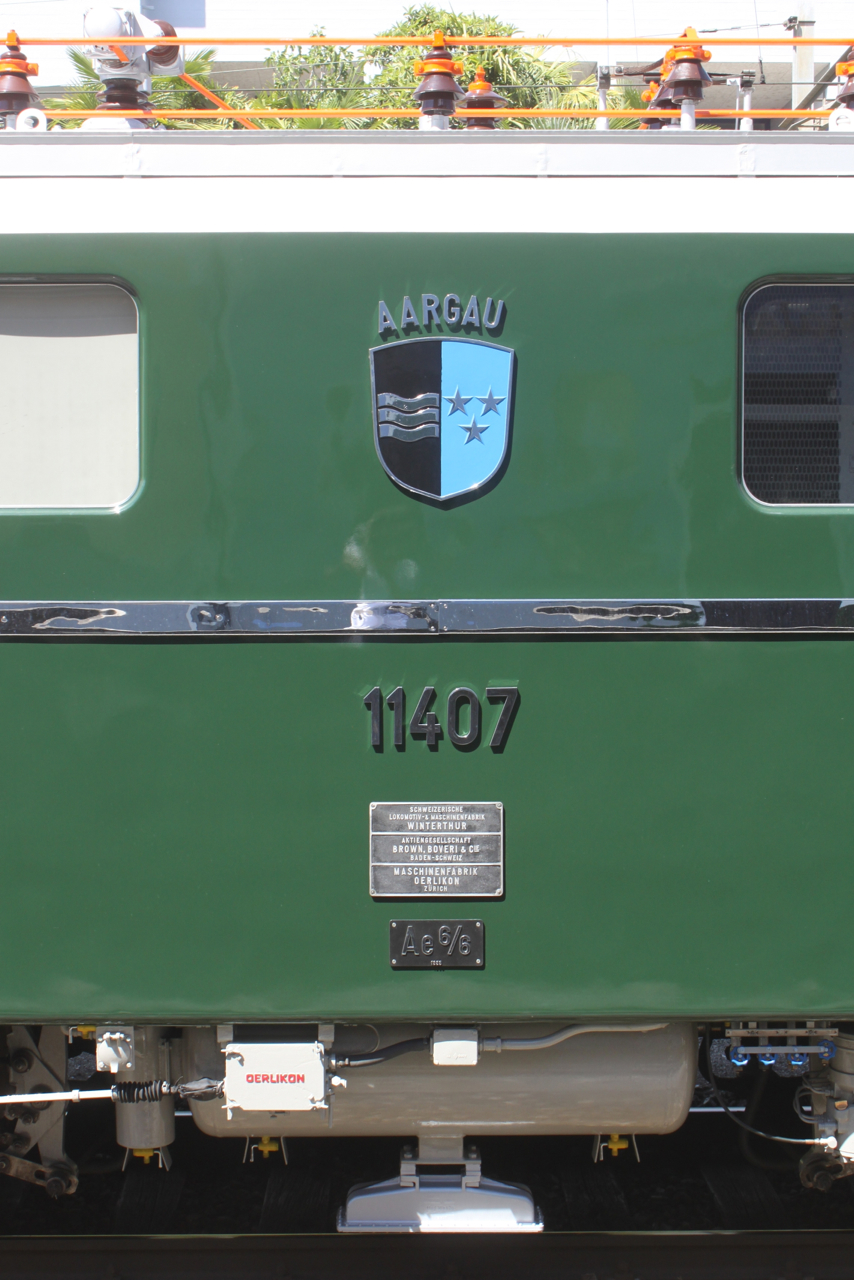
Side view of Ae 6/6 11407, named Aargau, with coat of arms

The locomotives' names and numbers are summarized below:

List of Ae 6/6 locomotives with names of cantons
№	Name	Preservation By SBB Historic, unless stated
11401	Ticino	Eisenbahnmuseum in Horb, Germany.
11402	Uri	Erstfeld
11403	Schwyz	
11404	Luzern	Elektrizitätsmuseum, Elektra Birseck Münchenstein
11405	Nidwalden	
11406	Obwalden	Only the cabin survives, preserved by DESM
11407	Aargau	Brugg AG. On loan to the association Mikado.
11408	Solothurn	
11409	Baselland	
11410	Basel-Stadt	
11411	Zug	Erstfeld
11412	Zürich	
11413	Schaffhausen	Swiss Museum of Transport in Lucerne
11414	Bern	Used as a source of spare parts
11415	Thurgau FD	
11416	Glarus FD	
11417	Fribourg	
11418	St. Gallen	Galliker Transport AG, Altishofen
11419	Appenzell I.Rh.	Privately owned, Biasca
11420	Appenzell A.Rh.	Museum in Sissach
11421	Graubünden	On loan to the 'Erhalt Lok Ae 6/6' association, Steinen
11422	Vaud	
11423	Valais	
11424	Neuchâtel	Swiss Train association
11425	Genève	Olten
11483	Jura	

List of Ae 6/6 locomotives with names of communes
№	Name	№	Name	№	Name
11426	Stadt Zürich	11458	Rorschach	11490	Rotkreuz
11427	Stadt Bern	11459	Chiasso	11491	Wohlen AG
11428	Stadt Luzern	11460	Lugano	11492	Emmen
11429	Altdorf	11461	Locarno	11493	Sissach
11430	Gemeinde Schwyz	11462	Biasca	11494	Schlieren
11431	Sarnen	11463	Göschenen	11495	Bülach
11432	Stans	11464	Erstfeld	11496	Stadt Wil
11433	Glarus	11465	Oerlikon	11497	St. Margrethen
11434	Stadt Zug	11466	Sursee	11498	Buchs SG
11435	Ville de Fribourg	11467	Zofingen	11499	Sargans
11436	Stadt Solothurn	11468	Lenzburg	11500	Landquart
11437	Stadt Basel	11469	Thalwil	11501	Renens
11438	Liestal	11470	Brugg	11502	Nyon
11439	Stadt Schaffhausen	11471	Pratteln	11503	Payerne
11440	Herisau	11472	Brig	11504	Le Locle
11441	Gemeinde Appenzell	11473	St.-Maurice	11505	Lyss
11442	Stadt St.Gallen	11474	Vevey	11506	Grenchen
11443	Chur	11475	Vallorbe	11507	Wildegg
11444	Aarau	11476	Les Verrières	11508	Wettingen
11445	Frauenfeld	11477	Martigny	11509	Gossau SG
11446	Bellinzona	11478	Sierre	11510	Rheinfelden
11447	Lausanne	11479	Visp	11511	Dietikon
11448	Sion	11480	Montreux	11512	Horgen
11449	Ville de Neuchâtel	11481	La Chaux-de-Fonds	11513	Wallisellen
11450	Ville de Genève	11482	Delémont	11514	Weinfelden
11451	Winterthur	11483	Porrentruy (later renamed Jura)	11515	Kreuzlingen
11452	Baden	11484	Romont	11516	Baar
11453	Arth-Goldau	11485	Thun	11517	Brunnen
11454	Yverdon	11486	Burgdorf	11518	Flüelen
11455	Biel/Bienne	11487	Langenthal	11519	Giubiasco
11456	Olten	11488	Mendrisio	11520	Langnau i.E.
11457	Romanshorn	11489	Airolo		

==== Jura canton locomotive ====
When the new canton of Jura (the 26th Swiss canton) was created in 1979, following decades of separatist demands, a locomotive had to be found to carry the new canton's name in keeping with the history of the Ae 6/6 as Kantonsloks. Instead of the logical 11426 (the next number after the rest of the canton-named locomotives), engine № 11483, named after Porrentruy, a Jura canton commune, was chosen to receive the name 'Jura'. Its previous name Porrentruy was transferred to Re 4/4^{II} 11239.

== 1970s to 1990s ==
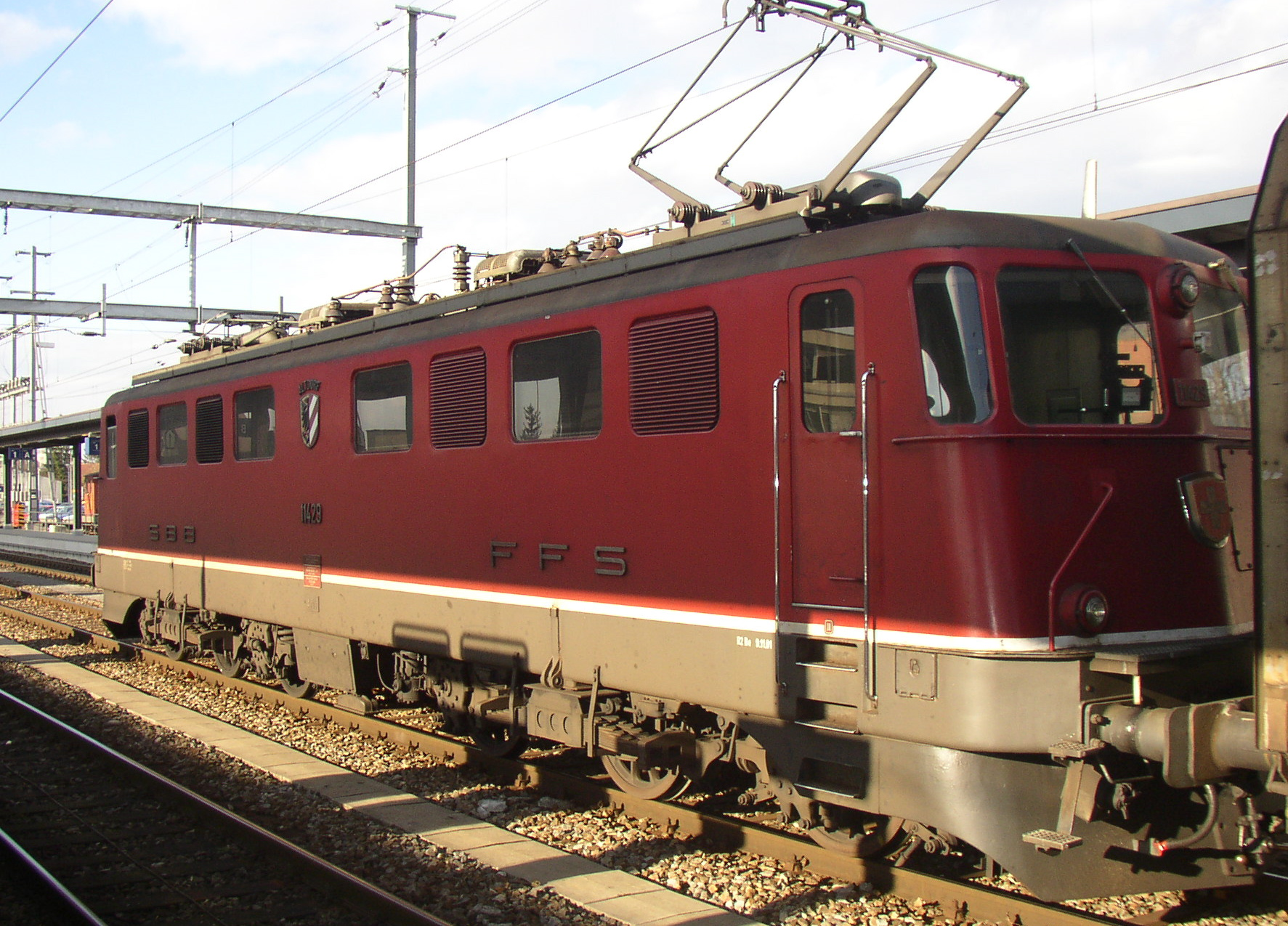
Ae 6/6 "Altdorf" at Weinfelden

=== Summary ===
In the 1970s, the two prototypes 11401 and 11402 were further developed, but never reached the quality of the series locomotives. In 1971, the first 'challenge' to the dominance of the Ae 6/6 came in the form of the new Re 4/4^{III} (Re 430) on the Gotthard line. The first real competition, however, was the Re 6/6 introduced in 1975, which was designed to be the successor of the Ae 6/6 and is nearly twice as powerful.

The former star of the Gotthard was thus displaced to 'lesser' services and has since mostly used in the Swiss Plateau and Jura Mountains.

=== Building blocks based construction ===
The series locomotives 11403-11520 were built in 'modular' style, with each separate section easily replaced. Some were involved in serious accidents, and could be fixed in short time thanks to this system.

=== Accident at Winterthur ===
On 12 April 1989, 11401 «Ticino» collided with an Re 4/4^{II} at Winterthur. One third of the locomotive body was damaged, and the locomotive division of the main workshop Bellinzona wanted to scrap it. However, railfans stood up for the preservation of this very first Ae 6/6 locomotive, so it got a second chance. It was a most elaborate and expensive rebuild and took two years.

== 21st century ==
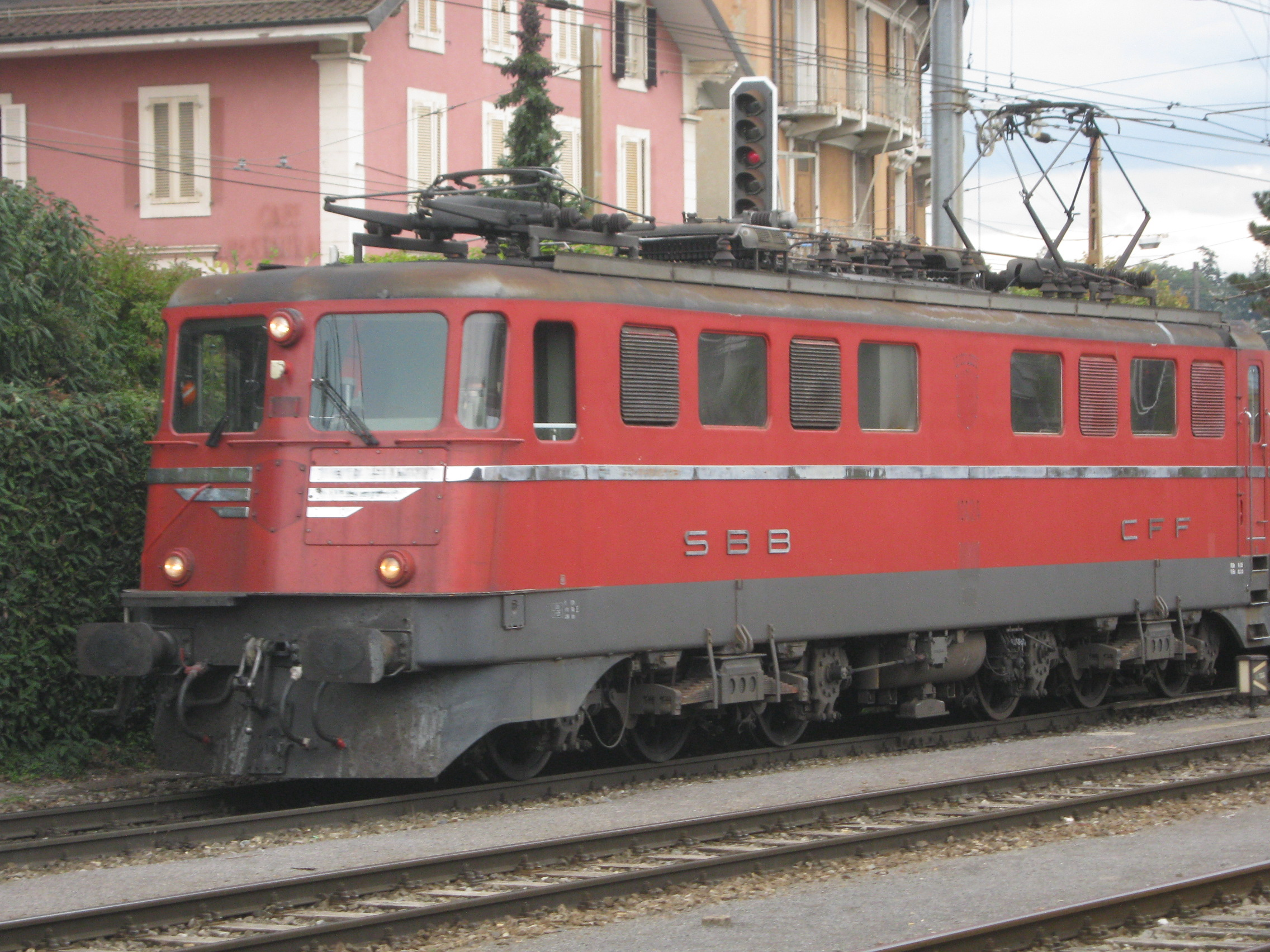
An Ae 6/6 in cargo service in Renens

In 1999, all 120 locomotives were assigned to the SBB cargo division (SBB Cargo) following the internal reorganisation of the SBB. The Ae 6/6 is still a very reliable locomotive for freight traffic.

Because the Ae 6/6 have three-axle bogies, they are deemed "rail killers" because of the higher rail abrasion compared to engines with two-axle bogies. This was especially considered an issue for freight runs on the Chemin de fer du Jura route Porrentruy-Bonfol.

One of the biggest disadvantages of the Ae 6/6 is said to be the lack of multiple unit train control, which makes operating two engines together impractical. At one time, retrofitting this feature was proposed, but these plans were discarded due to the uncertain future of the locomotive.

It was also considered to equip some of the newer engines with cab signalling, to allow them to run on cab signalling only-routes. This was tentatively done on the 11512 «Horgen».

The remaining operational locomotives are still used for freight trains, but often they just stand about in larger shunting yards. After the coats of arms were found to be being stolen repeatedly (mostly as a souvenir, because it is generally assumed that the Ae 6/6 won't stay in service much longer and will eventually be scrapped), SBB Cargo ordered their removal in March 2005 and will presumably turn them over to SBB Historic.

On 6 April 2009, the SBB announced that 65 of the class will be withdrawn from service because of the slump in demand caused by the recession. 53 will be stored pending an upturn whilst 12 will probably be scrapped or cannibalised. Revenue service stopped in 2013.

== Retirements from service ==
The first locomotive to be withdrawn was 11410 «Basel-Stadt», due to an accident in 2002. Since then more of the class have been withdrawn, among them the prototypes 11402 «Uri» and 11401 «Ticino». The rate of withdrawal accelerated in 2009.

In 2002, 11401 «Ticino» was a guest on the open day at the Muttenz shunting yard, shortly after its 50th birthday. After a cable fire this locomotive was withdrawn on September 11, 2003.

=== Ae 6/6 for SBB Historic ===
The foundation SBB Historic already received the prototype Ae 6/6 11402 «Uri», which will either remain operational as a historic locomotive or will become a static exhibit at Erstfeld railway station. 11401 «Ticino», the other prototype, is hosted at the railway museum Eisenbahn Erlebniswelt (Railway Adventure World) in Horb am Neckar (Germany). There is 11403 «Schwyz», and 11421 «Graubünden», in the SBB Historic club, 11405 «Nidwalden», was used for spare parts by SBB Historic for 11407 «Aargau», 11416 «Glarus», is used as spare parts for the historic locomotive 11425 «Geneva», for SBB historic, and also 11411 «Zug», is preserved by SBB Historic as well kept in running order. Also 11413 «Schaffhausen» is on long-term loan to Club del San Gottardo Railway from the Swiss Museum of Transport, Luzern.

=== Accident at Kaiseraugst ===
In May 2006 Ae 6/6 11437 «Stadt Basel» derailed on a catch point after passing a ground signal (Zwergsignal) at red on a shunting track. The engine ended up in a tilted position in the ballast beside the main track. However, it wasn't damaged heavily and returned to service soon after the incident, despite being scheduled for retirement.

=== Preservation ===
The SBB Ae 6/6s in various states of preservation include:

- Ae 6/6 11401 "Ticino" is preserved in the Eisenbahn Erlebniswelt in Horb, Germany.
- Ae 6/6 11402 "Uri" stationed in Erstfeld.
- Ae 6/6 11404 "Luzern" is preserved at the Elektrizitätsmuseum, Elektra Birseck Münchenstein.
- Ae 6/6 11406 "Obwalden". Only the cabin survives and is preserved by DESM.
- Ae 6/6 11407 "Aargau" stationed in Brugg. It is on loan to the association Mikado.
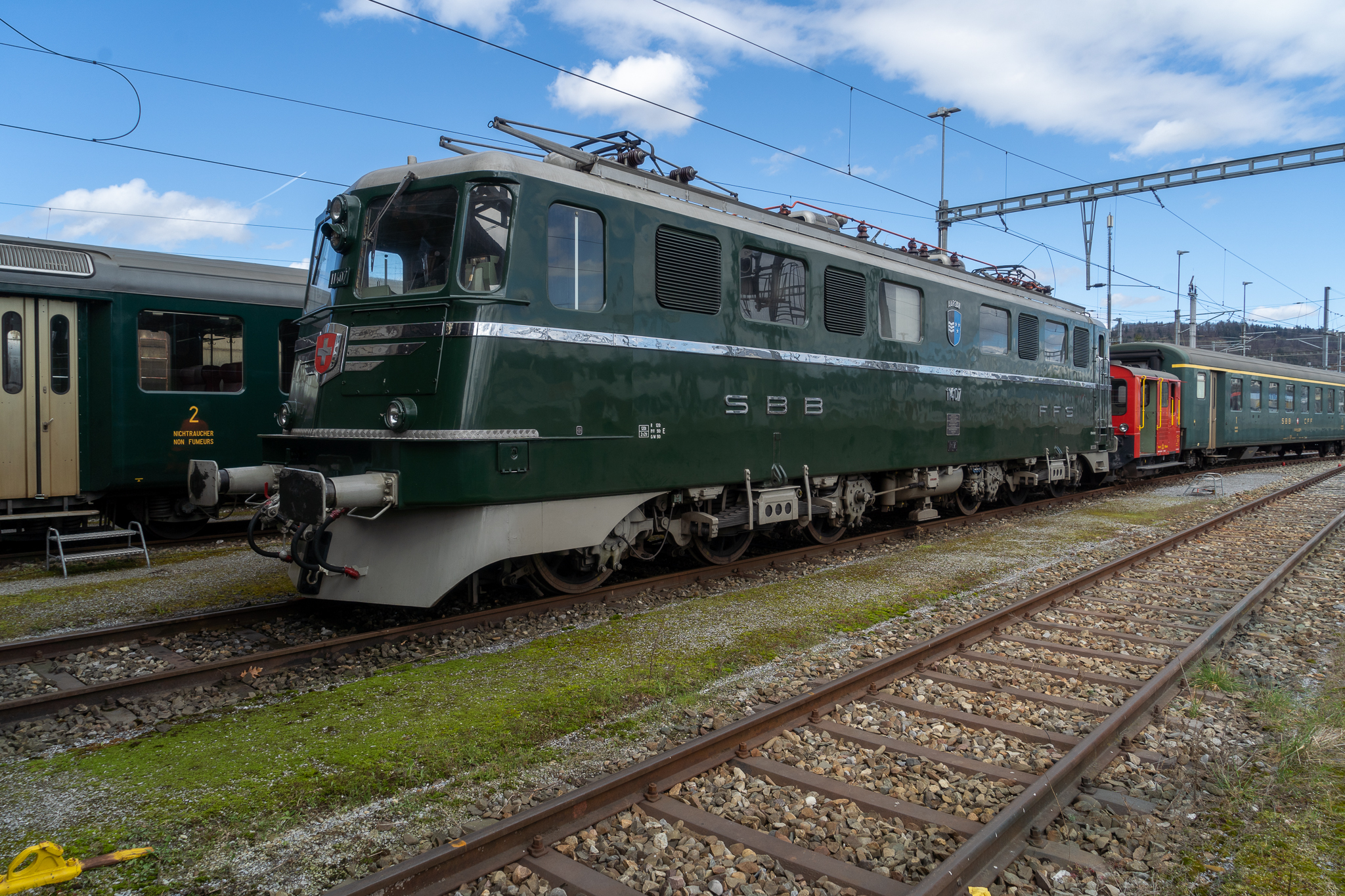
  Ae 6/6 11407 Aargau in Brugg
- Ae 6/6 11409 "Basel-Land" is a driving simulator at Railway Museum Kaeserberg
- Ae 6/6 11411 "Zug" stationed in Erstfeld.
- Ae 6/6 11413 "Schaffhausen" is at Club del San Gottardo in Biasca.
- Ae 6/6 11416 "Glarus". It is no longer usable and used as a source of spare parts in Olten.
- Ae 6/6 11418 "St. Gallen" is on static display at Galliker Transport AG Altishofen (it received the coat of arms of the canton of Lucerne instead of the original St. Gallen).
- Ae 6/6 11419 "Appenzell Innerrhoden" privately owned in Biasca.
- Ae 610 420-2 (formerly Ae 6/6 11420 "Appenzell Ausserrhoden") is parked in a small museum in Sissach, Basel Landschaft.
- Ae 6/6 11421 "Graubünden" preserved in Olten by Team 10439 Historische Loks.
- Ae 6/6 11424 "Neuchâtel" preserved by the Swiss Train association.
- Ae 6/6 11425 "Geneva" preserved in Olten by Team 10439 Historische Loks.
- Ae 6/6 11456 "Olten" was scrapped in Kaiseraugst in late 2019 or early 2020.
- Ae 6/6 11481 "La Chaux-de-Fonds". Only the cab survives and serves as a driving simulator in the Railway Museum Kaeserberg in Granges-Paccot.
- Ae 6/6 11501 "Renens". Preserved by the Swiss Train association.

The coats of arms of the cantons and the municipalities from the retired locomotives were handed over to SBB Historic. The donated collection includes most of the coats of arms from the Ae 6/6 locomotives and also including builder's plates, locomotive name plates and letter sets from certain locomotives.

== See also ==
- List of stock used by Swiss Federal Railways
- Swiss locomotive and railcar classification
