= SBB Ae 8/14 =

Swiss electric locomotive

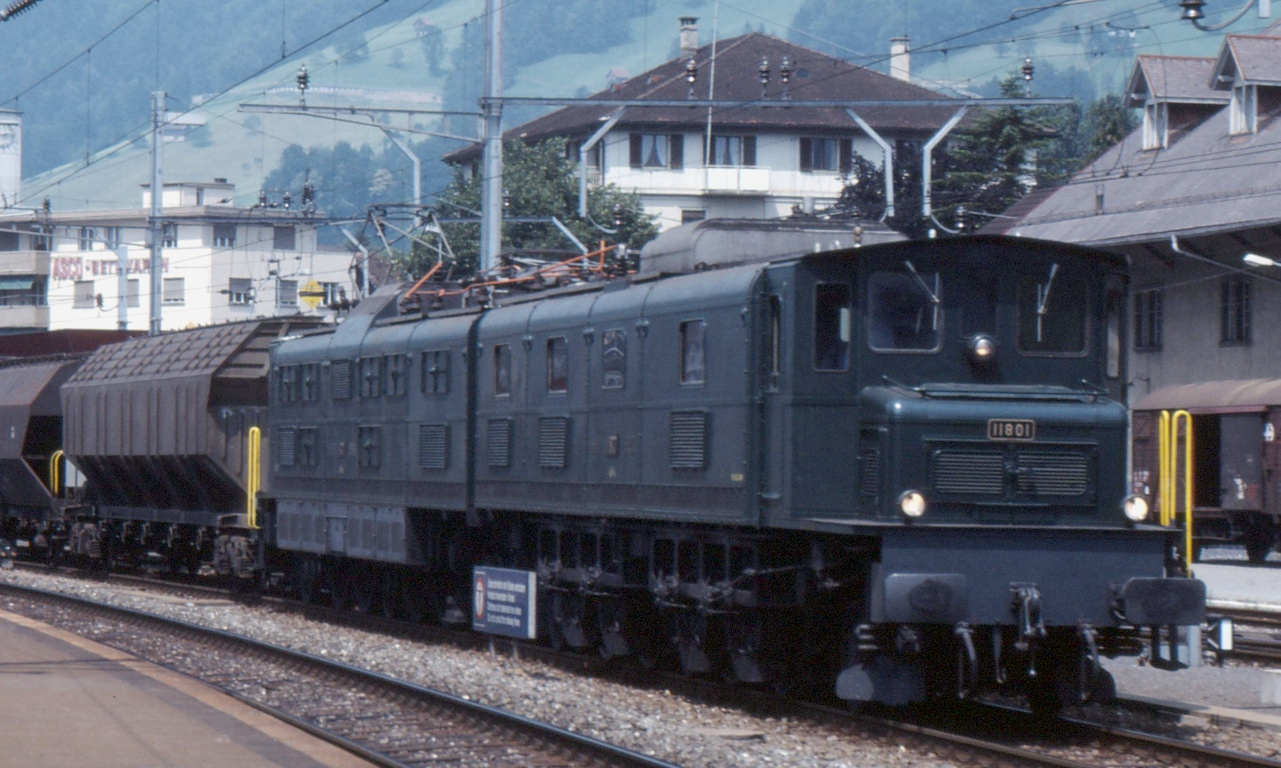
- SBB Ae 8/14 11801
Type and origin
- Build date: 1931 – 1938
- Total produced: 3
Specifications
- Configuration
  - UIC: (1A)A1A(A1)+(1A)A1A(A1)
- Gauge: 1,435 mm (4 ft 8 1/2 in)
- Electric system/s: 15 kV 16 2/3 Hz AC
Career
- Operators: Swiss Federal Railways
- Numbers: 11801, 11851, 11852
- Locale: Switzerland

The SBB Ae 8/14 is a class of electric locomotives built for Swiss Federal Railways to be used on the Gotthard railway. Only three prototype engines were built between 1931 and 1938, each of them in a different design.

The steep 2.7% grades of the Gotthard Railway are challenging for railroad operation. In the 1920s the trains became so heavy that the power and the traction of one locomotive became insufficient and so costly double-heading or splitting of the train over the mountain was required. Multiple-unit train control was at that time emerging and not yet a reliable working system.

The idea was to introduce double-locomotives with eight axles and a weight of 250 tons. These locomotives could pull the trains directly from Zurich or Lucern over the Gotthard and Monte Ceneri to Chiasso. This eliminated the stops for adding and removing additional locomotives in Erstfeld or Biasca, so that shorter travel times would be possible.

First two prototypes with the numbers 11801 and 11851 were built to evaluate the best suited drive system. A few years later a third prototype 11852 was built, which was quite similar to 11851 but with increased traction power.

== Design ==
All Ae 8/14s were double-locomotives with eight driving axles and six idlers. The running gear was built for 100 km/h so that the locomotives could be used for passenger trains. At the beginning all locomotives had special devices fitted which could mechanically transfer weight from the idlers to the driving axles by slightly lifting the idlers with pneumatic cylinders. This equipment was removed in the 1950s. All engines originally had no driver's seats, which meant that the engineer had to operate the engine standing in an upright position.

=== 11801 ===
This 1931 built locomotive had one Buchli drive per driving axle very similar to the SBB Ae 4/7. The drive was installed on the right side of each car body when looking in the direction of the driver's cab. The locomotive had a traction power of 5,514 kW and was used in revenue service till 1975. It is now a preserved, fully functional historic engine in the SBB-fleet. The traction power was reduced to 5,408 kW to avoid damages to the equipment.

=== 11851 ===
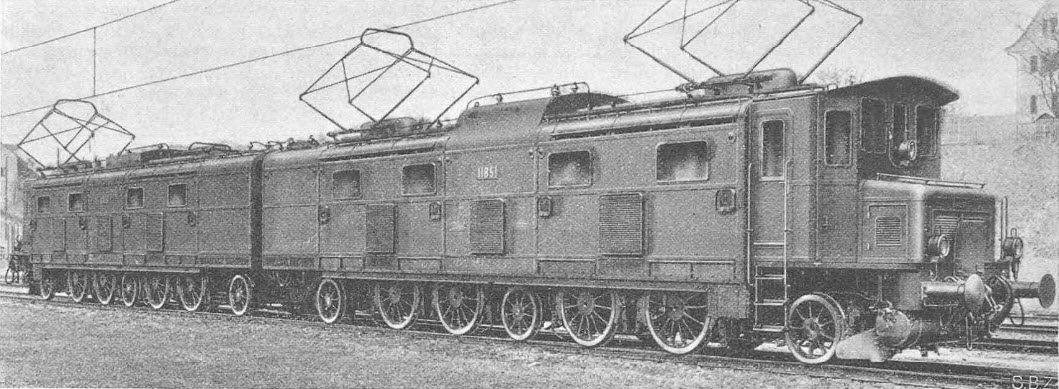
Builder's photo of 11851

The 11851 was built in 1932. The car body was similar to 11801 but the driving wheels were smaller and the axles were driven by double-motors with a Winterthur universal drive. The power was increased to 6,070 kW. The locomotive was equipped with driver's seats during a refurbishment in 1961. The resulting cabs were now quite similar to those of SBB Ae 6/6. The locomotive was withdrawn from revenue service in 1976 and later scrapped in Biasca.

=== 11852 ===
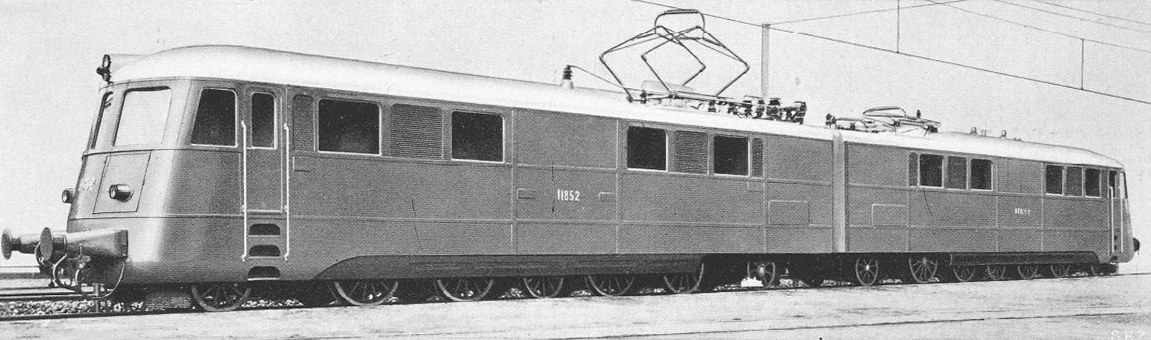
Builder's photo of 11852

The 11852 was an improved version of 11851. The running gear and the drives were the same as in 11851 but the car body was built in new light weight technology and with a new futuristic streamline design. The locomotive became very famous in Switzerland since it was shown off at the Swiss National Exhibition of 1939, where it showed the capabilities of the Swiss industry and supported the spiritual defence of the Swiss Nation during World War II. The locomotive was therefore nicknamed Landi-Lok, where Landi stays for the short form of Landesausstellung (German for Swiss National Exhibition) and Lok as short form of Lokomotive (German for locomotive). The 11852 had 8,170 kW traction power, and was therefore the most powerful locomotive in the world for some time after. In revenue operation, it quickly became obvious that the traction force could not be used completely since the couplers of the rail cars were at that time too weak.

In 1971, the locomotive was damaged in an electric fire while driving through the Gotthard tunnel. The damages were so severe that a repair would not have been economic. The outside of the locomotive was cosmetically refurbished and the locomotive was shown for years in front of the Swiss Transport Museum, but is now shown inside the museum.
