= DRG Class E 16 =

Class of German electric locomotives

Bavarian ES 1 DRG Class E 16 DB Class 116
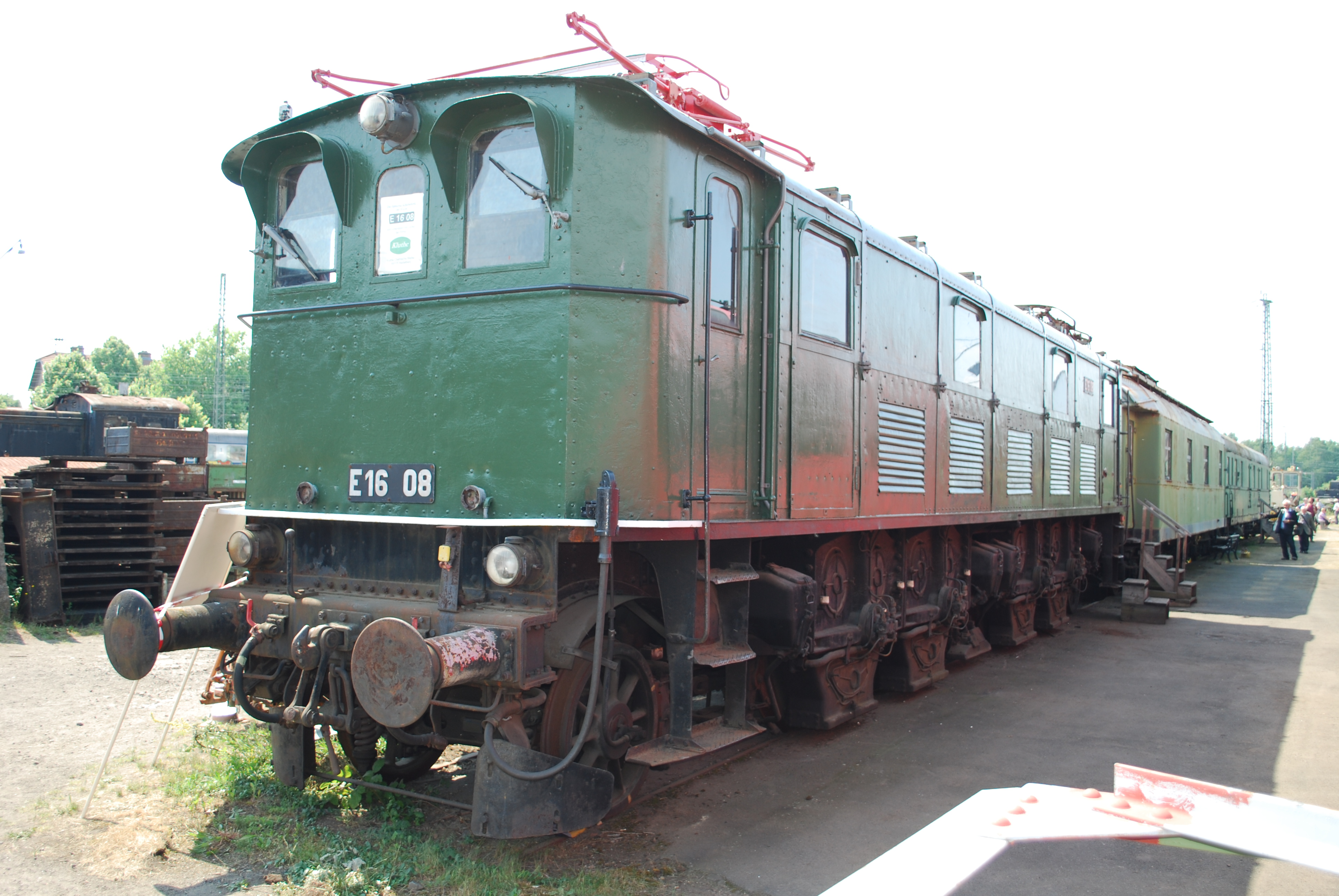
- DRG Class E 16
Type and origin
- Power type: Electric
- Builder: Mechanical: Lokomotivfabrik Kruss & Comp./Krauss-Maffei; Electrical: Brown, Boveri & Cie
- Serial number: Krauss: 8166–8175, 8420–8426, 8507–8508; Krauss-Maffei: 15356–15357; BBC: 5039–5048
- Build date: 1926–1927; 1932–1933
- Total produced: 21
Specifications
- Configuration
  - UIC: 1′Do1′
- Gauge: 1,435 mm (4 ft 8 1/2 in)
- Wheel diameter: 1,640 mm (5 ft 4 5/8 in)
- Trailing dia.: 1,000 mm (3 ft 3 3/8 in)
- Wheelbase: 12,600 mm (41 ft 4 1/8 in)
  - Axle spacing (Asymmetrical): 2,700 mm (8 ft 10 1/4 in) +; 1,850 mm (6 ft 7/8 in) +; 3,500 mm (11 ft 5 3/4 in) +; 1,850 mm (6 ft 7/8 in) +; 2,700 mm (8 ft 10 1/4 in)
- Length
  - Over headstocks: 15,000 mm (49 ft 2 1/2 in)
  - Over buffers: 16,300 mm (53 ft 5 3/4 in)
- Axle load: 20.1 t (19.8 long tons; 22.2 short tons)
- Adhesive weight: 80.2 t (78.9 long tons; 88.4 short tons)
- Service weight: 110.8 t (109.1 long tons; 122.1 short tons)
- Electric system/s: 15 kV 16 2/3 Hz AC Catenary
- Current pickup: Pantograph
- Traction motors: 4
- Transmission: Buchli drive
- Running step switch: Hand-operated lever-type starter (Flachbahnwähler) with twin contacts, transition resistors and 8 power shift gears (Lastschaltern)
- Gear ratio: 51:134
Performance figures
- Maximum speed: 120 km/h (75 mph)
- Power output
  - 1 hour: E 16 01-10: 2,340 kW (3,140 hp) @ 88 km/h (55 mph); E 16 11-17: 2,580 kW (3,460 hp); E 16 18-21: 2,944 kW (3,948 hp)
  - Continuous: E 16 01-10: 2,020 kW (2,710 hp) @ 94.3 km/h (58.6 mph); E 16 11-17: 2,400 kW (3,200 hp); E 16 18-21: 2,655 kW (3,560 hp)
- Power index: E 16 01-10: 21.15 kW/t; E 16 11-17: 23.3 kW/t; E 16 18-21: 26.6 kW/t
- Tractive effort
  - Starting: E 16 01-10: 14,500 kp (142,000 N; 32,000 lb_{f}); E 16 11-21: 20,000 kp (200,000 N; 44,000 lb_{f})
Career
- Numbers: K.Bay.Sts.E: 21 001 – 21 010; DRG E 16 01 – E 16 21; DB 116 001 – 116 021
- Retired: 1980

The DRG Class E 16 were German electric locomotives in service with the Bavarian Group Administration of the Deutsche Reichsbahn, and were conceived as motive power for express trains. They were initially designated as the Bavarian Class ES 1, before being incorporated into the DRG numbering plan as E 16.

== History ==
The first series (E 16 01 to E 16 10) was delivered in 1926, the second (E 16 11 to E 16 17) in 1927. The third, re-worked series (E 16 18 to E 16 21) was transferred to the Deutsche Reichsbahn in 1932 and 1933.

Numbers E 16 11 and E 16 13 were lost in the Second World War, E 16 12 was retired in 1967 after an accident. With the introduction of the DB classification system on 1 January 1968, the remaining 18 Class E 16 engines were regrouped into Class 116. Between 1973 and 1980 the engines were gradually withdrawn from service. On 31 January 1980, the last Class 116 locomotive, number 116 009, was finally retired.

== Design ==
One technical feature is the Buchli drive, in which the motors drive the driving wheels on one side only via outside gears; the other side is not driven. As a result, an E 16 has an asymmetric appearance. On one side you can see the Buchli drive, on the other just the bare spoked wheels. The E 16 is the only German locomotive class with Buchli drives.

The Brown, Boveri Cie (BBC) was responsible for the designs.

== Preserved locomotives ==
The following E 16 locomotives have been preserved:

- E 16 03 DB Museum Koblenz-Lützel
- E 16 07 Freilassing Locomotive World in Freilassing
- E 16 08 Darmstadt-Kranichstein Railway Museum
- E 16 09 Augsburg Railway Park

== See also ==
- List of DRG locomotives and railbuses
- List of Bavarian locomotives and railbuses
