= Pennsylvania Railroad class O1 =

PRR O1
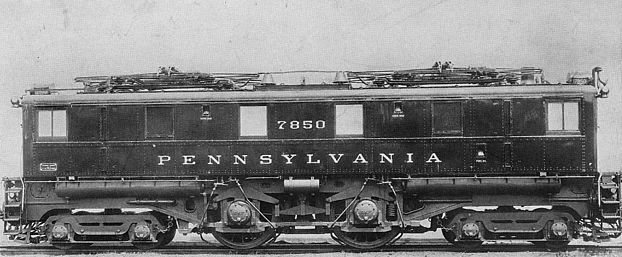
- PRR official photo of #7850
Type and origin
- Power type: electric
- Builder: PRR Altoona Works
- Build date: 1930–1931
- Total produced: 8
Specifications
- Configuration
  - Whyte: 4-4-4
  - AAR: 2-B-2
  - UIC: 2'B2'
- Gauge: 4 ft 8 1/2 in (1,435 mm) standard gauge
- Leading dia.: 36 in (914 mm)
- Driver dia.: 72 in (1,829 mm)
- Trailing dia.: 36 in (914 mm)
- Wheelbase: 40 ft (12.19 m) (overall); 10 ft (3.05 m) (fixed)
- Length: 52 ft 8 in (16.05 m)
- Width: 10 ft 6 in (3.20 m)
- Height: 15 ft (4.57 m) (over locked-down pantographs)
- Axle load: O1, O1b, O1c: 75,000 lb (34,000 kg); O1a: 78,000 lb (35,000 kg)
- Adhesive weight: O1, O1b, O1c: 150,000 lb (68,000 kg); O1a: 156,000 lb (71,000 kg)
- Loco weight: O1, O1b, O1c: 300,000 lb (140,000 kg); O1a: 309,400 lb (140,300 kg)
- Electric system/s: 11 kV 25 Hz AC Catenary
- Current pickup: Pantograph
- Traction motors: 4× (2 per axle), power output each - O1: 500 hp (370 kW); O1a, O1c: 625 hp (466 kW); O1b: 550 hp (410 kW)
- Transmission: AC current fed via transformer tap changers to paired motors driving geared quill drive
- Train heating: Steam generator
- Loco brake: Air
- Train brakes: Air
- Safety systems: Cab signalling
Performance figures
- Maximum speed: 90 mph (140 km/h)
- Power output: O1: 2,000 hp (1,500 kW); O1a, O1c: 2,500 hp (1,900 kW); O1b: 2,200 hp (1,600 kW)
- Tractive effort: O1: 28,500 lbf (127 kN); O1a, O1c: 37,500 lbf (167 kN); O1b: 35,000 lbf (160 kN)
- Factor of adh.: O1: 5.26; O1a: 4.16; O1b: 4.29; O1c: 4.00
Career
- Operators: Pennsylvania Railroad
- Class: 7850–7857
- Retired: 1948–49 (6), 1961 (2)
- Disposition: All scrapped

The Pennsylvania Railroad's class O1 comprised eight experimental boxcab electric locomotives built in 1930 and 1931. They were built in preparation for the New York to Washington Electrification project. They had the wheel arrangement classified as 4-4-4 in the Whyte notation (UIC: 2'B2'; AAR: 2-B-2). Although successful, they were not powerful enough for the railroad's increasingly heavy trains. For production, the PRR chose to concentrate on the P5 class, effectively an enlarged and more powerful version of the O1 with an additional pair of driving wheels.

The eight locomotives were divided into four sub-classes — O1, O1a, O1b, and O1c. Each sub-class was fitted with a different combination of traction motor power output and drive gear ratio. In addition, three O1 locomotives were fitted with General Electric equipment, three with Westinghouse, and two with Brown Boveri. The O1b locomotives used a Buchli drive between the traction motors and the driving wheels. Double traction motors were used, with two motors geared to each axle.

Class	Numbers	Motors	Power	Gear Ratio	Maximum Tractive Effort	Continuous Tractive Effort
O1	7850–1	4× 500 hp (370 kW)	2,000 hp (1,500 kW)	31:91	28,500 lbf (127 kN)	13,200 lbf (59 kN) @ 56 mph (90 km/h)
O1a	7852–3	4× 625 hp (466 kW)	2,500 hp (1,900 kW)	36:103	37,500 lbf (167 kN)	14,900 lbf (66 kN) @ 63 mph (101 km/h)
O1b	7854–5	4× 550 hp (410 kW)	2,200 hp (1,600 kW)	49:114	35,000 lbf (160 kN)	17,800 lbf (79 kN) @ 46 mph (74 km/h)
O1c	7856–7	4× 625 hp (466 kW)	2,500 hp (1,900 kW)	31:91	37,500 lbf (167 kN)	14,900 lbf (66 kN) @ 63 mph (101 km/h)

They were generally employed in pairs by sub-class, generally on short-distance passenger trains between Newark, New Jersey and New York City's Pennsylvania Station. During World War II they were used on the "Susquehannock" between Harrisburg, Pennsylvania and New York City. Later in life, they were used for transfer work around Penn Station and Sunnyside Yard, mostly hauling empty passenger stock. They were all out of service and scrapped by the mid 1960s.
