= SBB Ae 4/7 =

Swiss electric locomotive

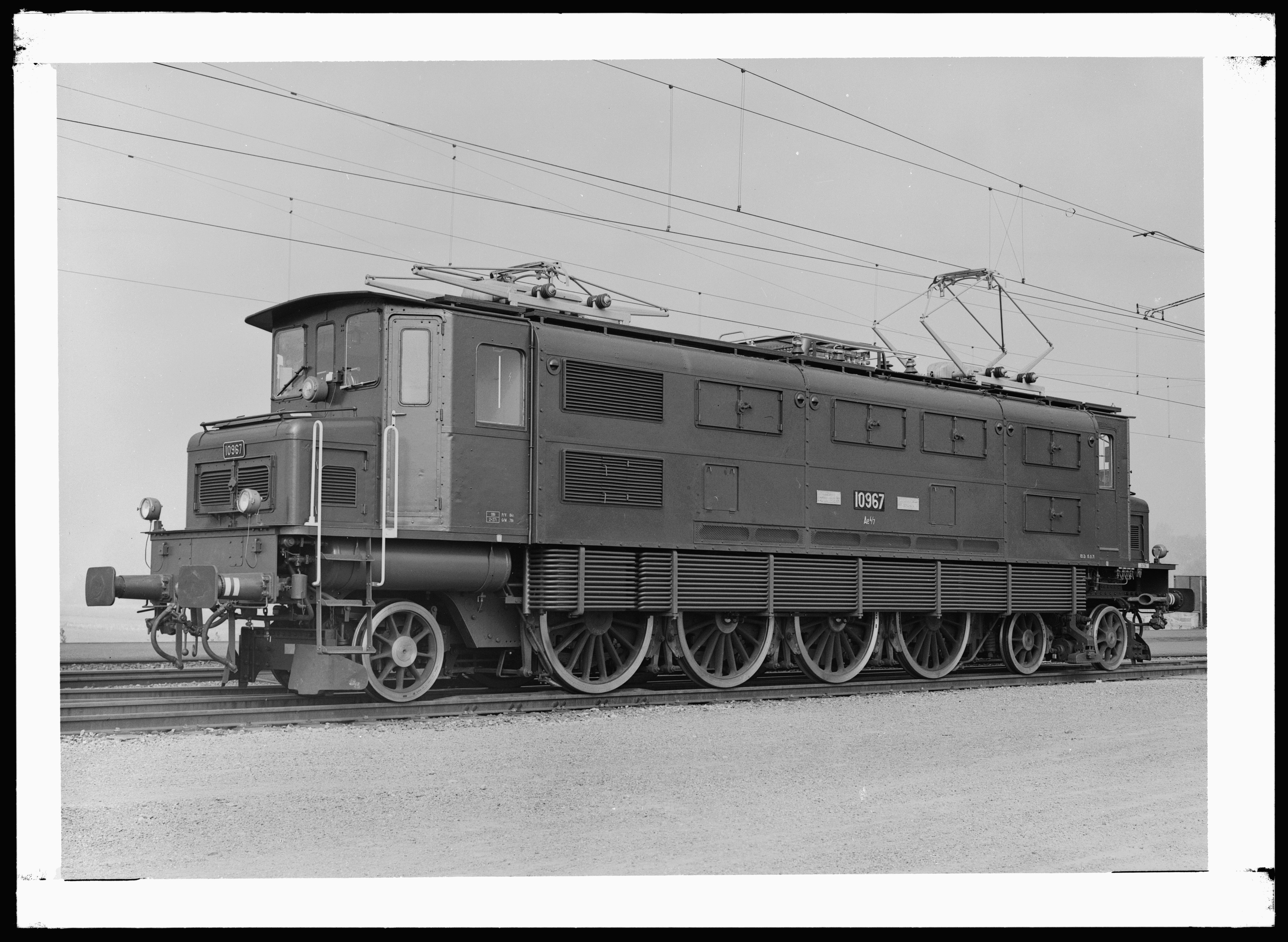
- SBB Ae 4/7
Type and origin
- Power type: Electric
- Builder: Swiss Locomotive and Machine Works (SLM), Brown, Boveri & Cie. (BBC), Maschinenfabrik Oerlikon (MFO), Société Anonyme des Ateliers de Sécheron (SAAS)
- Build date: 1927–1934
- Total produced: 127
Specifications
- Configuration
  - AAR: 2-D-1
  - UIC: 2′Do1′
- Gauge: 1,435 mm (4 ft 8 1/2 in)
- Length: 16,760 mm (55 ft 0 in) over buffers
- Width: 2,950 mm (9 ft 8 in)
- Height: 3,800 mm (12 ft 6 in)
- Loco weight: 118 to 123 tonnes (116 to 121 long tons; 130 to 136 short tons)
- Electric system/s: 15 kV 16 2/3 Hz AC Catenary
- Current pickup: Pantograph
- Transmission: Buchli drive
Performance figures
- Maximum speed: 100 km/h (62 mph)
- Power output: 2,300 kW (3,080 hp)
- Tractive effort: Continuous: 127 kN (29,000 lbf) at 65 km/h (40 mph)
Career
- Operators: SBB-CFF-FFS
- Numbers: 10901–11027
- Withdrawn: 1983–1996
- Restored: 1998 (2 for Rail4Chem)
- Disposition: 22 extant, remainder scrapped

The Ae 4/7 was a universal locomotive of the Swiss Federal Railways, employing the so-called Buchli drive.

Because of this drive construction, invented by Jakob Buchli, it was one of the longest-lasting Swiss locomotives. It was in regular use for 70 years, from the 1920s into the 1990s, hauling freight and passenger trains all over Switzerland.

== History ==
In the 1920s stronger locomotives were needed for the Swiss Plateau (which has grades up to 12‰). The existing locomotives with three driven axles were a bit weak for their services. Because the Buchli drive already proved to be reliable on the Ae 3/6^{I}, two prototypes of the Ae 4/7 were ordered in 1925. Subsequently, in total 127 were built between 1927 and 1935.

While the mechanical part was built by the Swiss Locomotive and Machine Works, the electrical equipment was built in three varieties, because these parts were built by three different manufacturers, Brown, Boveri & Cie. (BBC) (10901–10916, 10932–10938, 10952–10972, 11003–11008 and 11018–11027), Maschinenfabrik Oerlikon (MFO) (10917–10918 and 10973–11002) as well as Société Anonyme des Ateliers de Sécheron (SAAS) (10939–10951 and 11109–11017). The locomotives 10919–10931 were built by MFO but with BBC equipment.

== Equipment ==
The locomotive consists of four driving and three running axles. Each of the driving axles has its own motor. The power is sent to the axles using the Buchli drive. This gives them the characteristic asymmetrical look, because on the drive side the wheels are completely covered, while they are freely visible on the apparatus side.

At the end of driver's cab I a running axle bogie was mounted, while the other side got a single running axle. The four driving axles are fixed, but the two in the middle can move sideways for better running characteristics in curves.

The locomotives had the same green livery (SBB green) throughout their life. The Ae 4/7 look similar to the older Ae 3/6^{I} and the mechanical construction is quite similar as well, but this does not hold for many details of the electrical parts.

There were three varieties of locomotive. The MFO types got a very fast hopper controller to choose the running notches. The SAAS type hopper controller could not be switched arbitrarily fast as the MFO variety could be, due to a constraining device which limited the rate at which the running notches could be switched upwards. The BBC locomotives, in contrast, had a flat switch with a contact slide.

The second batch of the MFO locomotives have electrical brakes. The SAAS types where equipped with multiple-unit train control starting 1963, but none of the others were ever equipped.

== Operations ==
When they were delivered, the Ae 4/7 were used for fast trains all over Switzerland. Starting in 1930, they also ran the fast trains on the Gotthardbahn. Being universally usable, they could be seen in operation everywhere.

In the 1940s, they were partially replaced by the Re 4/4 ^{I} on flat lines. At the end of the 1950s, the prestigious services on the Gotthard line were more and more run by Ae 6/6. In 1960, four Ae 4/7 (10948–10951) got a wider pantograph compatible to ÖBB standards, so that they could run international trains from St. Margrethen via Bregenz to Lindau.

At the end of the 1960s, their fast train duties were taken over by the new Re 4/4 ^{II}. Some being equipped with multiple-unit train control, they could now be used for heavy freight trains.

Ae 4/7 that could not be run in multiple mostly ran commuter trains and light freight trains. In 1993, 66 years after their first delivery, they were still used for commuter trains mostly in eastern Switzerland, and in front of a few light freight trains. By this time, the class had accumulated over 8 million operating km. With the prospect of staying in use over the millennium, they even got new UIC numbers Ae 497 000 – 497 027 and 497 901 – 497 999.

The first Ae 4/7 was withdrawn due to its bad condition in 1983. In 1990, 100 of the originally delivered 127 were still in operation. On January 1, 1995, 72 locomotives remained. The actual withdrawal started 1995, which was slightly surprising, since a few years earlier the SBB stated that they will stay in use until after the year 2000. However, due to the delivery of the new Re 460 the SBB had more locomotives than needed, which made the Ae 4/7 superfluous.

One year later most were retired and many scrapped. The last regular train run by an Ae 4/7 for the Swiss Federal Railways was a freight train in 1996. The Ae 4/7 were used by the SBB from 1927 to 1996, in total 69 years. This is only exceeded by their predecessors, the Ae 3/6 I, which were in use from 1921 to 1994, in total 73 years.

== Preservation ==
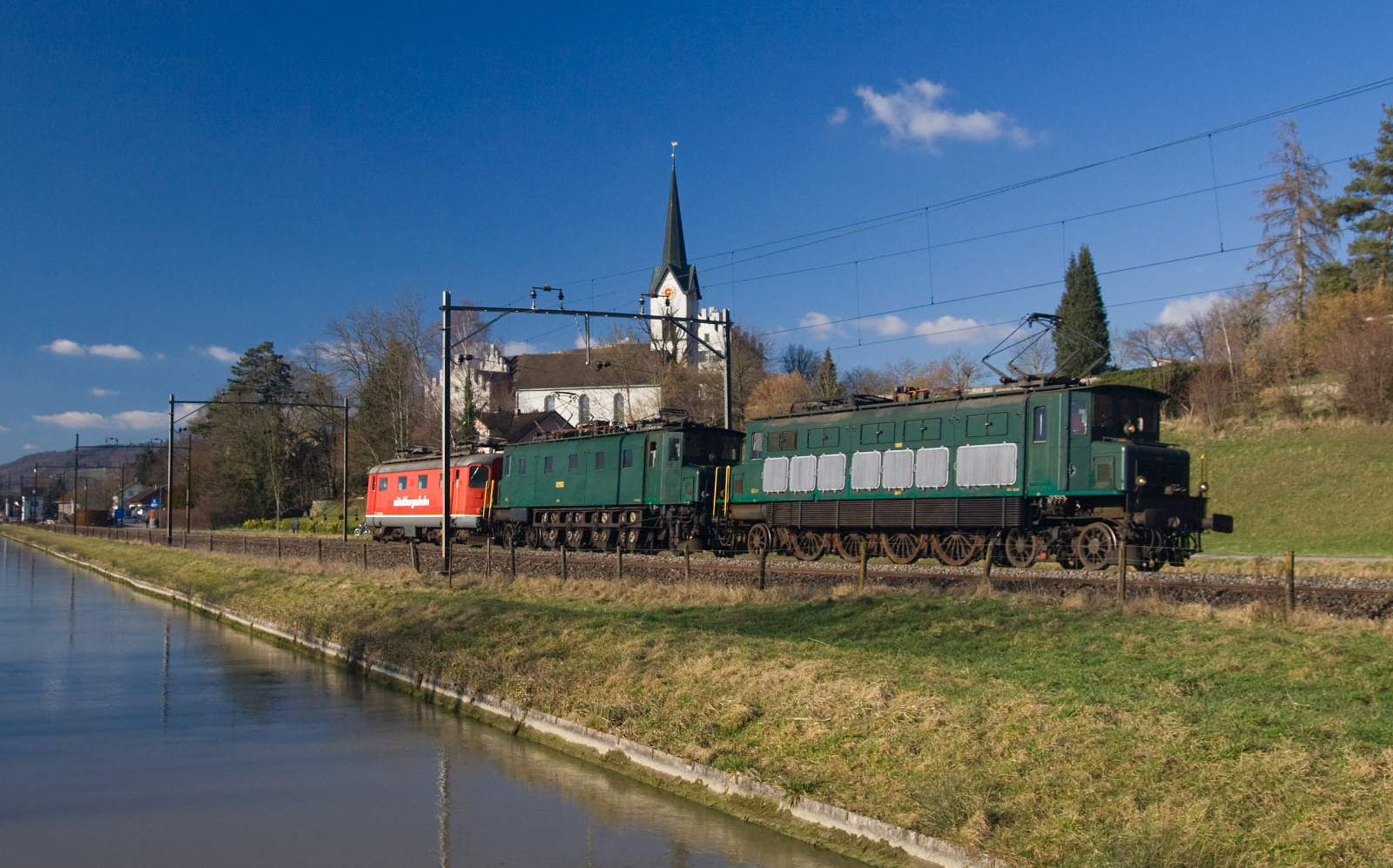
Two Ae 4/7 on a trial run in 2007. Note the difference in appearance; both sides can be seen

The two locomotives 10905 (Depot Rorschach) and 10976 (Depot Lausanne) remained operational as historic stock and now belong to Stiftung Historisches Erbe der SBB (SBB Historic). About 18 locomotives with all three types of electrical equipment made it to private owners, which form the Swisstrain association. Most of these locomotives are not operational.

In January and February 2007 two Ae 4/7, 10950 (built in 1931) and 11010 (built in 1932), were reactivated and got the certification to run on the Swiss rail network, which required the installation of the current train protection system ZUB 121. They briefly hauled commercial trains for Rail4Chem in 2008.

Locomotive 10997 is owned by Club del San Gottardo.

Locomotives 10902, 10950, 10987, 11000, and 11010 are owned by the association Swisstrain SA Based in Le Locle.

== See also ==
- List of stock used by Swiss Federal Railways
