= Buchli drive =

Electric locomotive transmission system

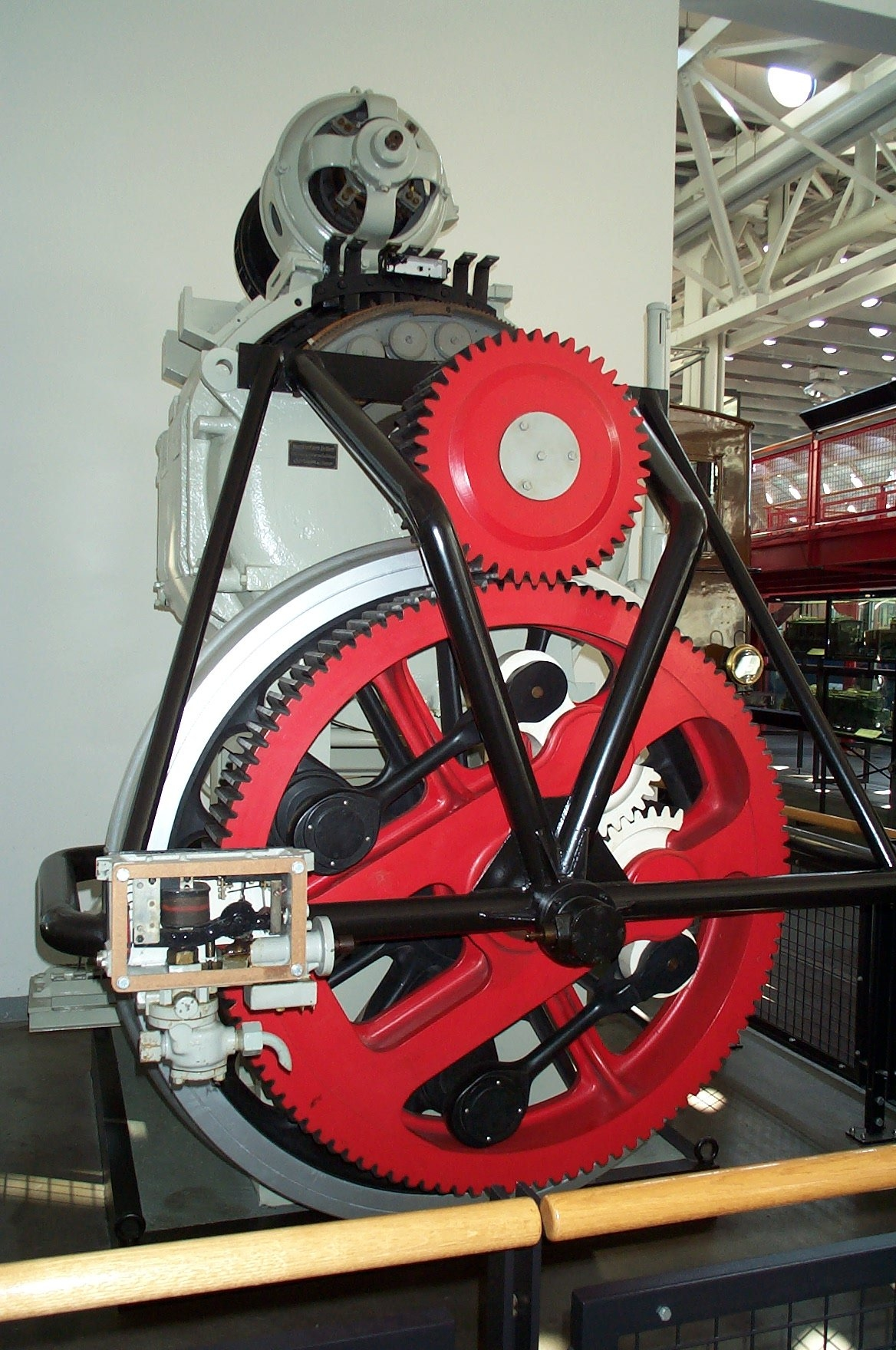
Buchli-Toggle drive with inner frame

The Buchli drive is a transmission system used in electric locomotives. It was named after its inventor, Swiss engineer Jakob Buchli. The drive is a fully spring-loaded drive, in which each floating axle has an individual motor, that is placed in the spring mounted locomotive frame. The weight of the driving motors is completely disconnected from the driving wheels, which are exposed to movement of the rails.

First used in electric locomotives from the 1920s, the Buchli drive made possible the construction of faster and more powerful locomotives that required larger and heavier traction motors. The system minimises the impact on rail tracks due to the reduction in the overall unsprung weight. Although the drive was very successful through the 1930s, it is little used in modern locomotives, having been replaced with smaller, simpler drives that exhibit less imbalance and allow higher speeds.

== Construction ==
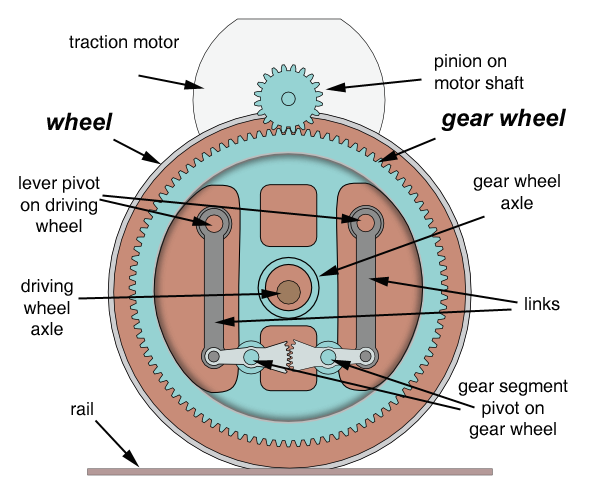
Buchli-Toggle-drive

How Buchli drive works

In a Buchli drive a driven gear wheel is securely fixed to the locomotive frame. Inside this gear wheel are two levers, coupled to gear segments that mesh with one another. The other end of the levers is coupled via universal joints to tension bars, which are then coupled via more universal joints to the driving rail wheel.

Vertical movement of the driving wheel results in the gear segments moving due to the internal mechanism, and the driving wheel can move in a horizontal or vertical direction with respect to the gear wheel, while still transferring the momentum of the gear wheel.

A disadvantage of the drive was the large number of moving parts, which demanded frequent lubrication and careful maintenance. As a result the Buchli drive system was mainly used on express train locomotives, as there were no other drive systems that gave the same performance at high speeds. However, at higher speeds the drive components became unbalanced, causing issues at speeds over 140 km per hour.

== Standard design ==
The Buchli drive was exported to other rail companies as one sided separate traction motor drive, usually with an inside frame.

The motor framework with the wheelset bearing is located between the wheel disks of the driving wheels. The gear wheel, which is housed in an auxiliary frame outside the driving wheels and is surrounded by a protective casing, is on one side of the driving wheels. Each gear wheel is driven by an individual traction motor, which is located above the gear wheel in the locomotive body.

With this implementation, a strongly one-sided weight distribution occurs in the underframe through the remote gear wheels. In order to maintain stability of the locomotive on the longitudinal axis, heavy equipment inside the locomotive body must be arranged on the opposite side of the drive equipment.

Locomotives with a Buchli drive also typically have an asymmetrical appearance: on one side, the bearings of the drive wheels are visible, on the other side, they are almost completely covered by the wheel cover box of the gear wheels.

== Other designs ==
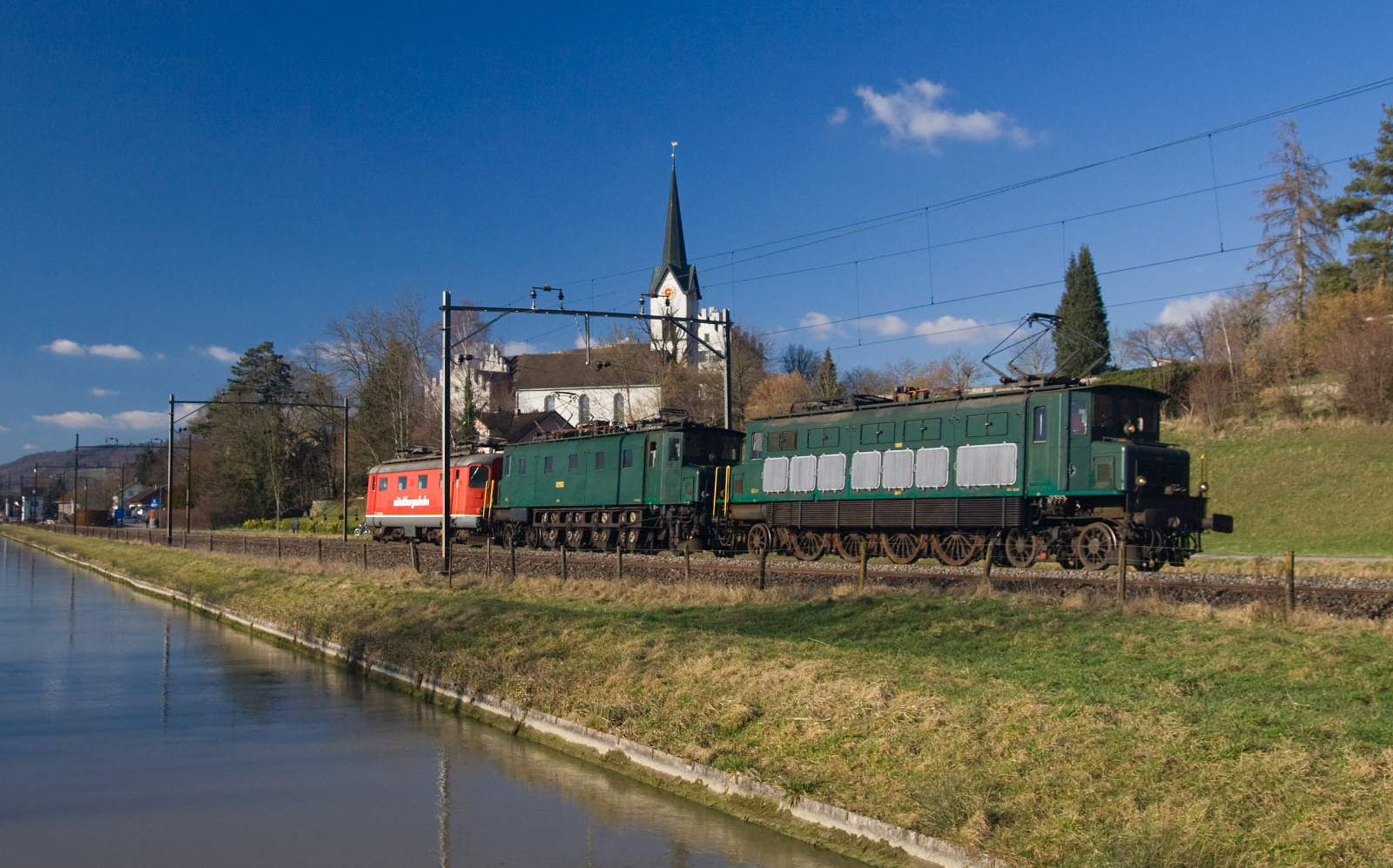
Two Ae 4/7 on a trial run in 2007. Note the difference in appearance; both sides can be seen

In addition to the standard implementation, there were also the following variations:

=== Outside frame ===
The engine framework with the driving wheel housing is outside the wheel disks of the driving wheels. The driving wheel is enclosed by a quill camped in the locomotive cabinet, on which the gear wheel sits. Examples included the Pennsylvania Railroad O1b, and the Deutsche Reichsbahn ET11.01.

=== Group drive ===
The motor is arranged between the floating axles. A common pinion or a pinion on both motor end drives the gear wheels of the neighbouring axes. U.S. patent 1,683,674 described this design, but vehicles implementing it are not known.

=== Bilateral drive ===
The driving wheel is coupled with two gear wheels, and the motor has a pinion on both sides. The taps in the wheel disk are warped about 90 degrees against each other so that the drive imbalance can be reduced. This version of the driver was used for greater driving power.

However with this arrangement, there is the danger of mechanical stress in the drive components. Examples included the French express train locomotives: SNCF 2D2 5400, SNCF 2D2 5500, SNCF 2D2 9100.

=== Two motors per axis ===
Two driving motors work on one common gear wheel, which is interconnected with a driving wheel. Examples include the Pennsylvania Railroad O1b.

== Locomotive with Buchli drive ==
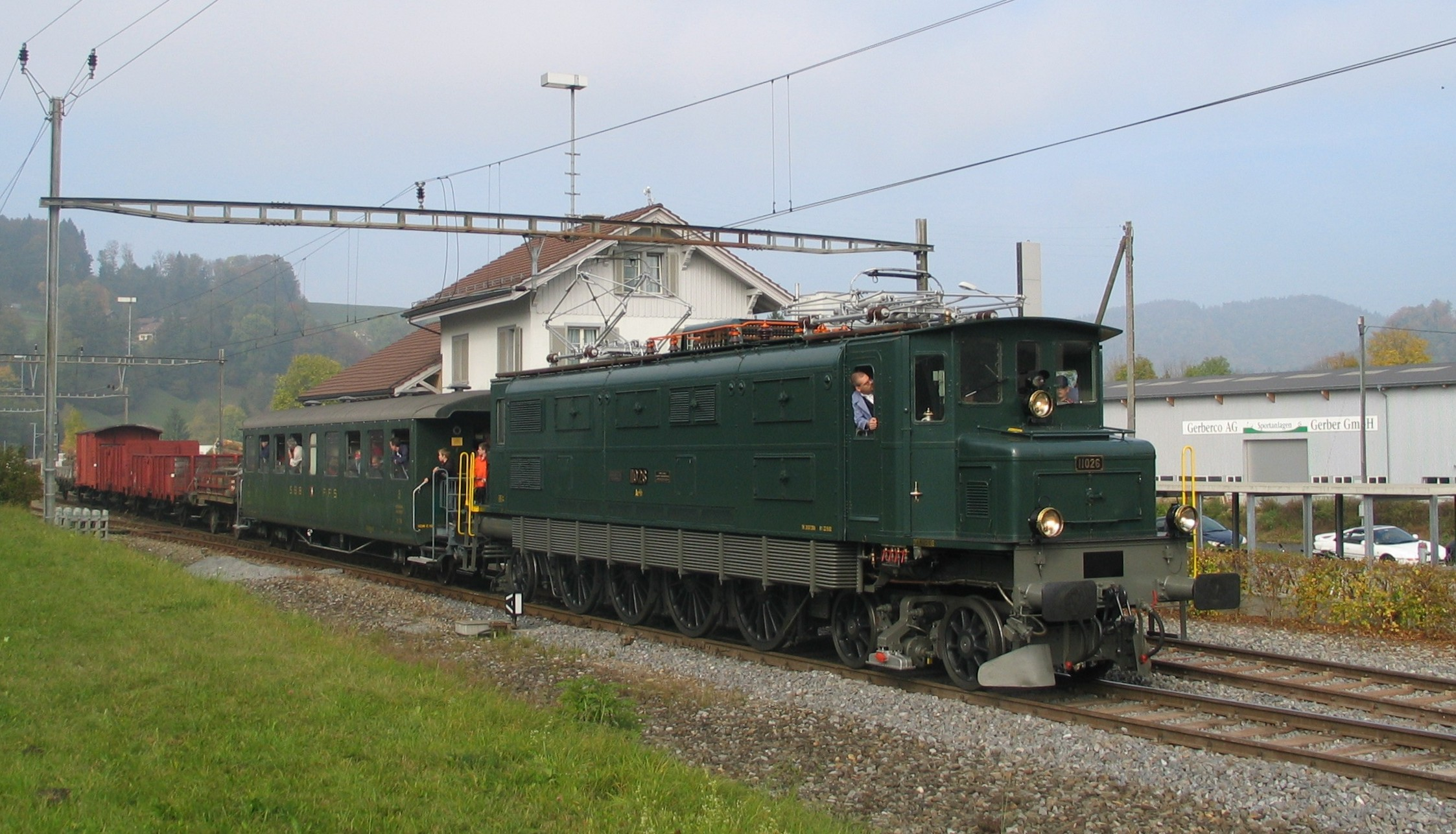
SBB-CFF-FFS Ae 4/7 class locomotive

Nearly 240 locomotives of the SBB with Buchli drive were in use for over sixty years. The SBB Ae 3/6^{I} class locomotives were in operation from 1921 to 1994. French tracks had 100 express train locomotives using the Buchli drive, in service for fifty years.

- SBB-CFF-FFS, Switzerland
  - SBB Be 2/5 (Prototype locomotive) (Deutsch)
  - SBB Ae 4/8 (Prototype locomotive) (Deutsch)
  - SBB Ae 3/6^{I}
  - SBB Ae 4/7
  - SBB Ae 8/14 (11801)(Deutsch)
- Deutsche Reichsbahn, Germany
  - E 16 (116) (Deutsch)
  - ET 11.01 double railcars Bo'2'+2'Bo'. Constructed in 1938, implementation without frame. The vehicle was rebuilt in the 1960s and the Buchli drive system was removed
- SNCF
  - SNCF Class 2D2 5400 (mutual drive) (Français)
  - SNCF Class 2D2 5500 (mutual drive) (Français)
  - SNCF Class 2D2 9100 (mutual drive) (Français)
- Indonesian national railway
  - 3000 - four 1'Do1' locomotives for the 1.5 kV electrification system, manufactured by SLM and BBC in 1924 and 1926, scrapped 1976 or thereabouts. This locomotive was the first type to get the Java bogie. image
- Japanese Government Railways
  - 7000 - two (1A)Bo(A1), constructed in 1926, later renumbered as the ED54 class (ja)
- Indian Railways
  - EA/1 and EA/2 (later on WCP-1 and WCP-2) - 2′BoA2′- 22+1 units built in 1928-30 by SLM, Vulcan Foundry and MetroVick.
  - EB/1 and EC/1 (later on WCP-3 and WCP-4) - 2′Co2′ - 1+1 units built in 1928 and 1938.
- Renfe
  - Renfe series 272, ordered by predecessor company NORTE, 12 constructed in 1928 as the Stk 2′Co′Co′2′ for a 1.5 kV supply voltage.
- Paulista-Railway, Brazil
  - 320, 1′Do1′, constructed in 1932.
- Czechoslovak State Railways
  - E 465.0 - 2 Stk 1′Do1′ locomotive for 1.5 kV supply voltage. Built in 1927 and scrapped in 1962
- Pennsylvania Railroad, United States
  - Pennsylvania Railroad O1b - 2 Stk 2′Bo2′ locomotives. Built with inside frame and two driving motors per axle.
- Circumvesuviana, Italy
  - 1′Do1′ locomotive. 5 units 0301 built in 1931 and 0302-0305 built in 1934. All built by Tecnomasio Italiano Brown Boveri.

== See also ==
- Quill drive
- Tschanz drive
- Winterthur universal drive
