= Elektrizitätsmuseum =

Coordinates: 47°30′51″N 7°37′01″E

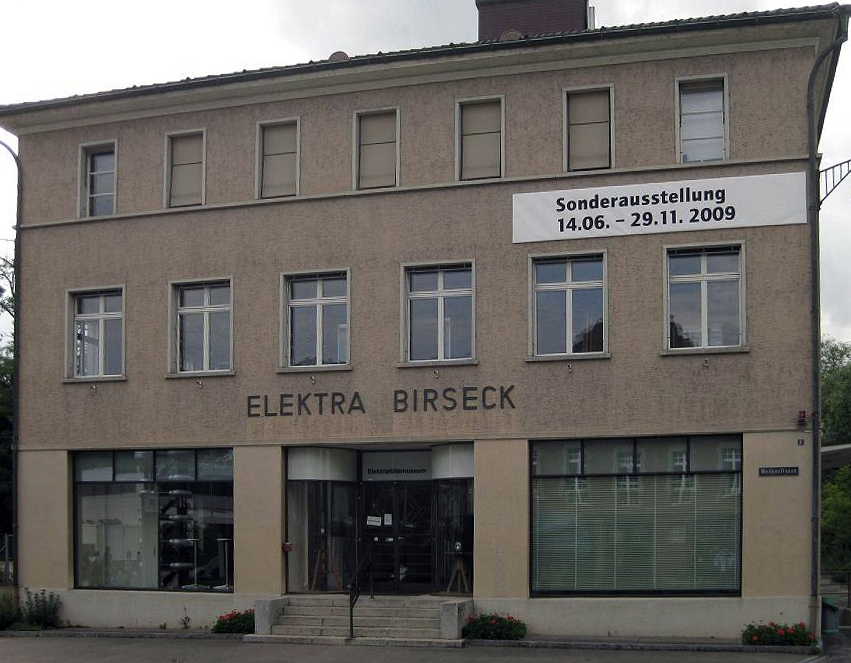
Old Elektrizitätsmuseum (in the grounds of the Elektra Birseck) Münchenstein.

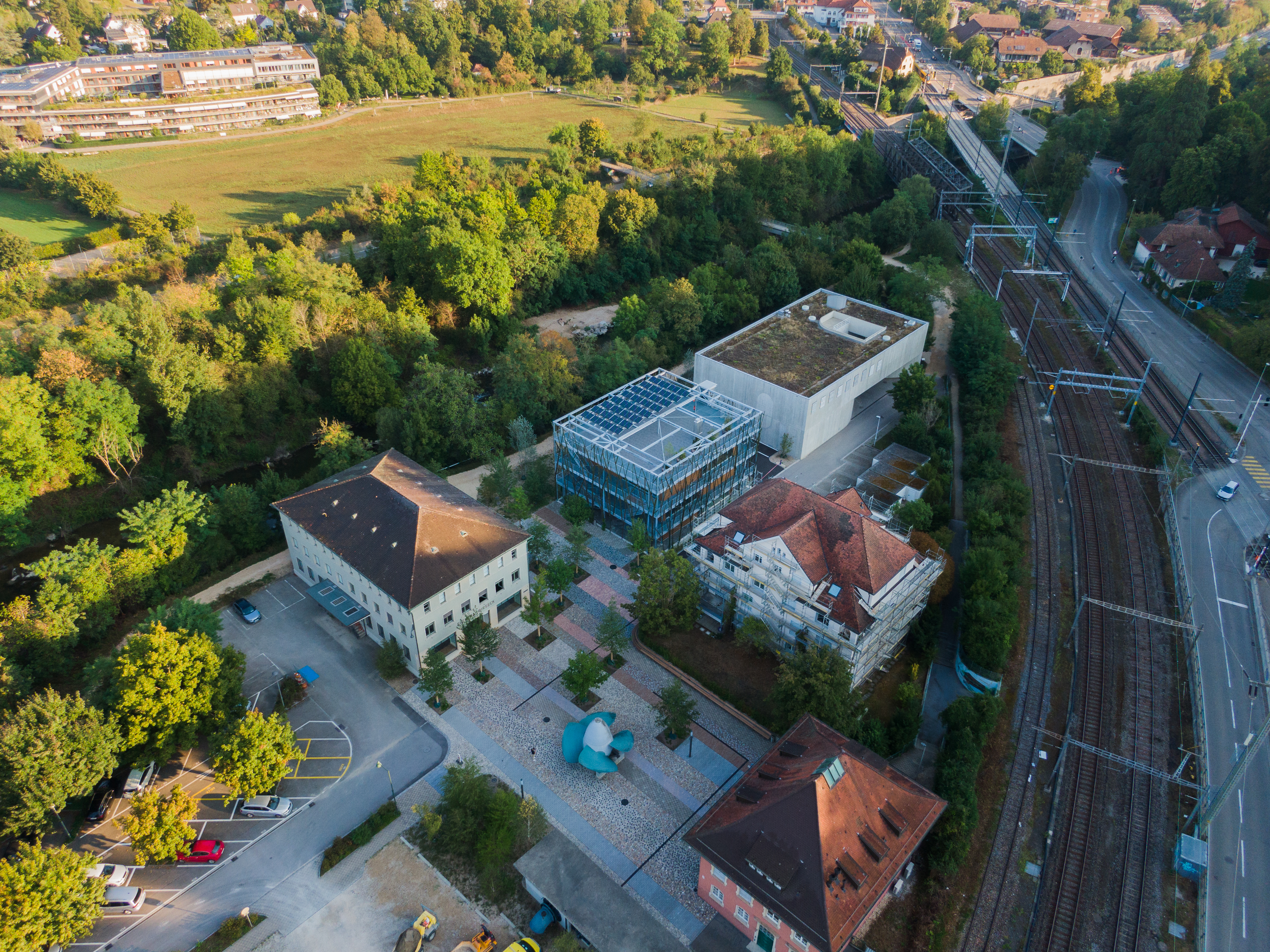
Old Musem and adjacent new building - the museum includes the red building

The Elektrizitätsmuseum (Museum of Electricity), now Primeo Energie Kosmos since 2022, lies in Münchenstein in the canton of Basel-Country in Switzerland.

The Elektrizitätsmuseum was opened in 1997, belonging to the electric utility Elektra Birseck Münchenstein (EBM), being renamed in 2019 to Primeo Energie. Exhibits explore the history and development of power production and its use. The collection contains rare historic equipment and is complemented by a laboratory in which visitors can experiment with electric power.

The actual exhibition was developed as part of Primeo Energie's 125th anniversary in 2022, which included erecting a new building. This new building was built using more than two thirds of its parts either recycled or locally CO2-neutral. The exhibition as well focusses on Sustainability of Renewable energy and climate neutrality.

== Special exhibitions ==
- „Rechnen unter Strom“, (calculation under current):
  „From counting frame to electronic brain“ and „Exclusives from the Basler super brains Bernoulli und Euler“, exhibition in 2006.
- „Licht - vom Kienspan zur LED“, (Light from Fatwood to LED).
  Special Exhibition from 14 June 2009 to 15 December 2009.
- „Kommunikation - Vom Rauchzeichen zum iPhone“, (Communication from smoke signal to iPhone):
  Special exhibition from 24 October 2010 until 22 May 2011.

== See also ==
- History of electrical engineering
- History of electromagnetism
