= Primeo Energie =

- Type: Cooperative
- Industry: Electric utility
- Founded: 1897
- Headquarters: Münchenstein (Basel-Landschaft), Switzerland
- Key people: Cédric Christmann Chief Executive Officer (CEO), Andreas Büttiker (Chairman of the board)
- Products: energy production, energy trading, renewable energy, grid, heat, energy efficiency
- Revenue: 2,281,509,000 ±1000 Swiss franc (2022)
- Number of employees: 727 (2025)
- Website: www.primeo-energie.ch

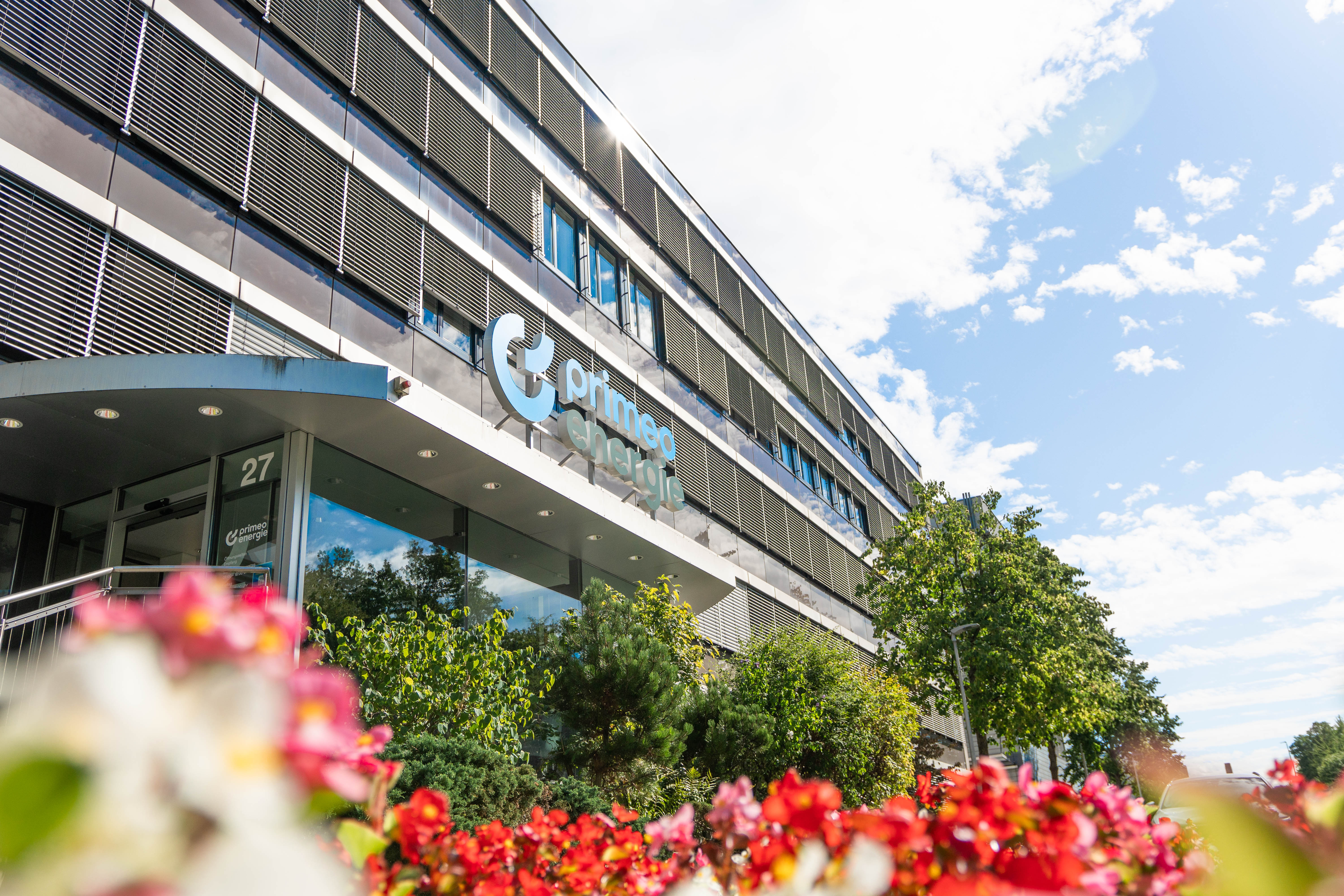
Primeo Energie, Head office in Münchenstein (Switzerland)

Primeo Energie Kosmos, Münchenstein (Switzerland)

Primeo Energie is a Swiss energy group headquartered in Münchenstein, in the canton of Basel-Landschaft. The group operates in Switzerland and France and is active in electricity supply and trading, electricity distribution, district heating, industrial energy services and electricity generation.

Founded in 1897 as Elektra Birseck Münchenstein (EBM), the company is organised as a cooperative. It operates across the electricity value chain, from generation and procurement to trading, distribution and supply, and also provides heating and other energy services.

== History ==
Primeo Energie was founded in 1897 as Elektra Birseck Münchenstein (EBM) by engineer Fritz Eckinger and politician Stephan Gschwind. The cooperative was established to introduce electric lighting and provide electricity to municipalities in the Birseck region near Basel.

The electricity distribution network gradually expanded into neighbouring areas of the cantons of Basel-Landschaft and Solothurn. Between 1906 and 1914, EBM connected eleven additional municipalities and the town of Saint-Louis in the French region of Alsace (then German Reich) to its network.

From the late 1970s, EBM became involved in energy conservation and energy efficiency. In 1982, it commissioned its first combined heat and power plant. The company subsequently expanded its activities in decentralised heat generation and district heating.

In the 1990s, EBM began investing in photovoltaic installations and other renewable energy technologies. In 2005, it established Kleinkraftwerk Birseck AG to develop its renewable electricity generation activities. The company entered the French market in 2010 through the acquisition of small hydroelectric power plants and was renamed aventron in the same year. Additional investors subsequently acquired stakes in the company.

In 2016, EBM participated in the acquisition of Aare Versorgungs AG (AVAG), an electricity distribution company serving the Olten region.

The company also expanded its activities in electricity supply, energy trading and energy services in Switzerland and France. In 2019, EBM and its group companies adopted Primeo Energie as their common brand. The cooperative retained its previous legal name until April 2026, when it was renamed Primeo Energie Genossenschaft.

In Münchenstein, the company operates the Primeo Energie Kosmos, a centre for exhibitions and educational activities relating to energy and climate. Opened in 2022, it developed from an electricity museum established in 1997 to mark the cooperative's centenary. The centre provides interactive exhibitions and educational programmes for schools and the general public.

== Organisation ==
Primeo Energie is organised as a cooperative under Swiss private law. The cooperative is the parent organisation of the Primeo Energie Group, whose operating activities are conducted through subsidiaries and associated companies.

At the end of 2025, the cooperative had 59,286 members. Its governing bodies include the general assembly of delegates, the board of directors and the executive management.

The group is structured into four business segments: Energy Solutions, Grids and Services, Heating and Industrial Solutions, and Generation. These activities are carried out through companies operating in Switzerland, France and other European countries.

== Business activities ==
=== Energy solutions ===
The Energy Solutions segment comprises the procurement, trading and supply of electricity and gas, together with related energy services in Switzerland and France. Its customers include industrial and commercial companies, electricity utilities, municipalities and private households. The segment also provides energy portfolio management, power purchase agreements, balancing services and solutions for the local generation and consumption of electricity.

In Switzerland, these activities are conducted primarily through Primeo Energie Schweiz AG, a joint venture with Elektrizitätswerke des Kantons Zürich (EKZ), which holds a 25% stake. In France, the group operates through Primeo Energie France SAS and related companies. Its activities include electricity supply to industrial and commercial customers, energy procurement and trading, the marketing of electricity from renewable sources and energy-related services.

The French business has also expanded into the residential electricity market. At the end of 2025, its residential customer portfolio comprised approximately 154,000 customers.

=== Grids and services ===
The Grids and Services segment covers the construction, operation and maintenance of electricity distribution networks, basic electricity supply and network-related services in Switzerland and France. In Switzerland, the group operates distribution infrastructure in parts of the cantons of Basel-Landschaft and Solothurn, including the Olten region. In France, its network activities are concentrated in Alsace.

The segment also provides services such as metering, the operation of third-party networks, public lighting and technical services relating to electricity infrastructure. Electricity distribution and basic supply are regulated under the respective national legal frameworks. At the end of 2025, the segment comprised approximately 178,000 metering points.

=== Heat and industry solutions ===
The Heating and Industrial Solutions segment develops, finances and operates heating and cooling systems, district heating networks and energy infrastructure for residential, commercial and industrial customers. The group's heating activities are concentrated in Switzerland and France. Its facilities use different energy sources and technologies, including biomass, heat pumps, recovered heat and fossil fuels.

In addition to district heating, the segment provides industrial energy services and operates heating and cooling infrastructure under long-term contracting arrangements. At the end of 2025, the group reported 170 heating networks and heating installations, including facilities operated on behalf of third parties and investments in associated companies. Total heat sales amounted to 414 GWh during the year.

=== Production ===
The Generation segment comprises electricity generation, investments in power plants, long-term electricity procurement and energy storage. The group's electricity procurement portfolio includes interests in conventional Swiss electricity generation, the Birsfelden and Augst hydroelectric power stations, long-term electricity supply agreements and production from renewable energy installations.

A substantial part of its renewable electricity generation activities is conducted through aventron, which develops, acquires and operates wind farms, photovoltaic installations and small hydroelectric power plants in Switzerland and several European countries.

The group is also active in battery storage through Primeo Battery AG, which develops and operates large-scale electricity storage facilities in Switzerland. In 2025, the group reported 317 power plants with a combined installed capacity of 863 MW. Its electricity generation amounted to 1,343 GWh.

== Shareholdings ==
Primeo Energie holds interests in several companies operating in electricity supply, distribution, heating and renewable energy generation.

Its principal subsidiaries and investments include:

- Primeo Energie Schweiz AG: Electricity supply, trading and energy services in Switzerland. Primeo Energie holds 75% of the company, with the remaining 25% held by Elektrizitätswerke des Kantons Zürich (EKZ).
- Primeo Energie France SAS: Electricity supply and energy services in France. Primeo Energie holds 65%, while French renewable energy company Qair holds 35%.
- Primeo Netz AG: Electricity distribution and network services in Switzerland.
- Aare Versorgungs AG (AVAG): Electricity distribution in the Olten region. Primeo Energie holds a majority stake.
- Primeo Wärmeholding AG: Holding company for heating and industrial energy activities in Switzerland and France.
- Primeo Battery AG: Development and operation of large-scale battery storage facilities in Switzerland.
- aventron Holding AG: Holding company with a majority interest in the renewable electricity producer aventron.

The group's investments also include partnerships with other Swiss energy utilities and institutional infrastructure investors.
