= Associazione CSG Swiss Railpark St. Gotthard =

Associazione CSG Swiss Railpark St. Gotthard (CSG)
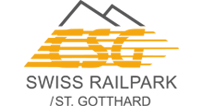
- Formation: 1980
- Founder: Marco Morisoli
- Purpose: Rail tourism, acquisition, restoration and preservation of historic railway rolling stock
- Headquarters: Biasca, Switzerland
- Website: www.clubsangottardo.ch

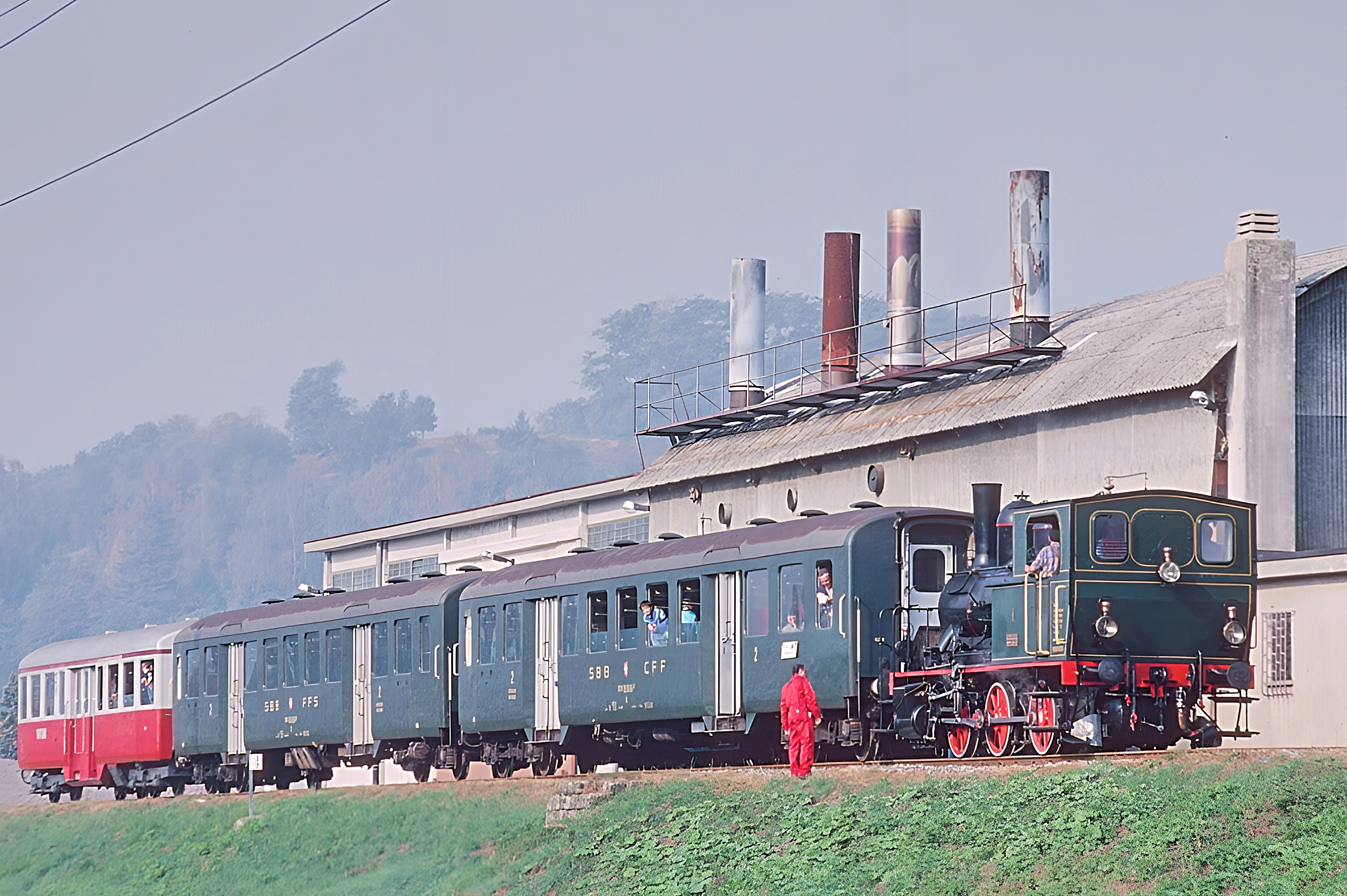
Excursion train of the Club del San Gottardo in autumn 1997

The Associazione CSG Swiss Railpark St. Gotthard, from 2017 Club del San Gottardo, short form CSG, is an association for the preservation of historic railway vehicles and the creation of tourist attractions in the Swiss canton of Ticino. It was founded in 1980 and named after the Gotthard railway. Originally based in Mendrisio, it was relocated to Biasca in 2022. The association owns a depot in Mendrisio.

The club operates the Italian Valmorea Railway and its Swiss section, the Mendrisio–Stabio line, as a heritage railway.

In the early 1990s, the association took over the green-painted former SBB E 3/3 8501 and three passenger cars from the former Oswalt Steam company for excursions in Ticino.

== Rolling stock ==
- BT Eb 3/5 6, J.A.Maffei, built 1910
- SBB E 3/3 Nr. 8463, SLM shop number 1623, green
- SBB E 3/3 Nr. 8501, SLM shop number 2076, brown
- SBB Ce 6/8 II Nr. 14276, SLM shop number 2773
- GBS Ce 4/4, formerly GTB Ce 4/6 Nr. 312, SLM shop number 2494, since 2013 from the BLS-Stiftung in Burgdorf
- SZU Em 836 number 506 «Leu»
- SOB BDe 576 251 with two intermediate cars B and ABt control car
- GB AB2ü number 161 «Vallesana», SIG, built 1903
- GB AB2ü Nr. 162 «Salone», SIG, built 1903
- GB AB2ü Nr. 166 «Bar», SIG, built 1903
- SOB ABr 241 «Gipfeliwagen», SWS, built 1953
- JS K2, boxcar, manufactured in Belgium, built 1899
- SBB Db «Sputnik», brake van
