= Brown, Boveri & Cie =

Swiss group of electrical engineering companies (1891–1988)

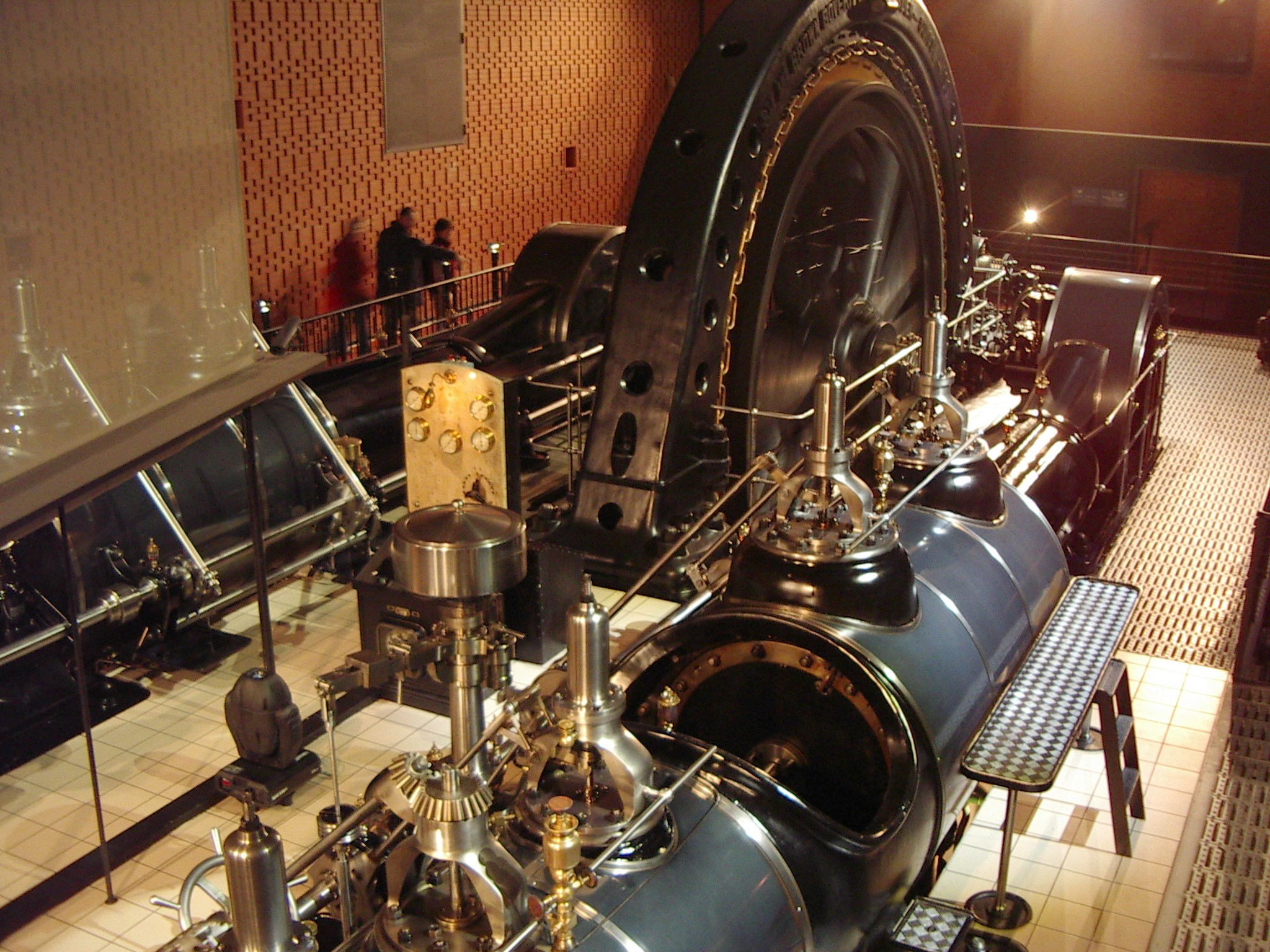
- Sulzer steam engine and Brown-Boveri alternator from 1901 in the Electropolis museum in Mulhouse, France
- Industry: Electrical engineering
- Predecessor: Holding Brown Boveri & Cie AG
- Founded: 1891
- Defunct: 1 January 1988 (merged with ASEA to form ABB)
- Fate: Merged with ASEA to form ABB
- Successor: ABB
- Headquarters: Switzerland

Brown, Boveri & Cie. (Brown, Boveri & Company; BBC) was a Swiss group of electrical engineering companies. It was founded in Baden bei Zürich, in 1891 by Charles Eugene Lancelot Brown and Walter Boveri who worked at the Maschinenfabrik Oerlikon. In 1988 BBC merged with ASEA to form ABB.

== Early history of BBC Brown Boveri ==
BBC Brown Boveri was established in 1891. The company was one of only a few multinational corporations to operate subsidiaries that were larger than the parent company. Because of the limitations of the Swiss domestic market, Brown Boveri established subsidiaries throughout Europe relatively early in its history, and at times had difficulty maintaining managerial control over some of its larger operating units. The merger with ASEA, a company which was praised for its strong management, was expected to help Brown Boveri reorganize and reassert control over its vast international network.

=== Activity in Britain ===
Brown Boveri's early activities included manufacturing electrical components such as electric motors for locomotives and power-generating equipment for Europe's railway systems. In 1919 the company entered into a licensing agreement with the British manufacturing firm Vickers which gave the British firm the right to manufacture and sell Brown Boveri products throughout the British Empire and in some parts of Europe. The agreement gave Brown Boveri a significant amount of money and the promise of substantial annual revenue, and also helped the company expand into foreign markets at a time when protectionist policies inhibited international expansion.

=== Activity in Continental Europe ===
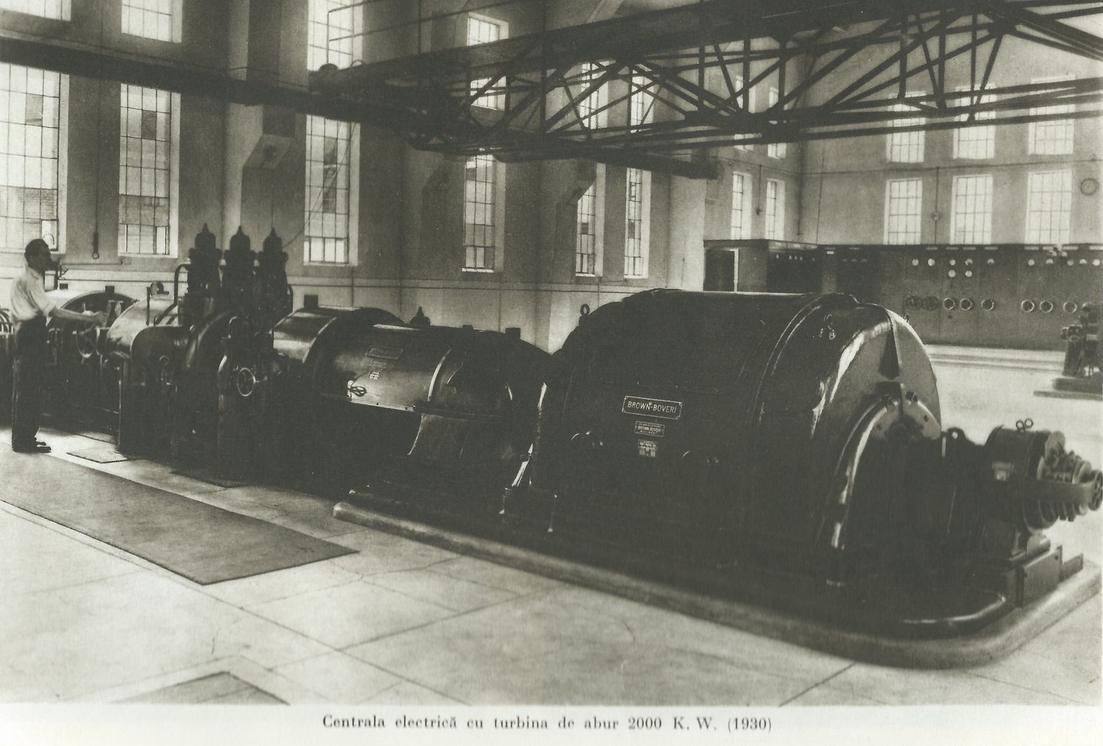
Steam turbine at Letea Bacău paper mill (1930)

In the early 1920s, Brown Boveri, which was already a geographically diversified company with successful operating subsidiaries in Italy, Germany, Norway, Austria, Czechoslovakia and the Balkans, suffered losses due to the devaluation of the French franc and the German mark. At the same time, in the Swiss domestic market, production costs increased while sales remained static, causing the company further losses. In 1924 Brown Boveri devalued its capital by 30 percent to cover the losses it had incurred. In 1927 the agreement with Vickers ran out and was not renewed. Besides the arrangement Brown Boveri had had with this British firm, it also had a similar relationship with Netherlands-based Heemaf which lasted well into the early 1960s when the Heemaf led the creation of Holec (Holland Electric).

=== Growth ===
During the same time, Brown Boveri's various subsidiaries grew rapidly. Industrialization throughout Europe created strong demand for the company's heavy electrical equipment. Italy's burgeoning railroad industry provided a particularly strong boost to Brown Boveri's Italian subsidiary, and the company's German facility actually did considerably more business than the Swiss parent. For the next few decades Brown Boveri grew as fast as technological developments in electrical engineering. Each of the company's subsidiaries tended to develop individually, as if it were a domestic company in the country in which it operated, and broad geographic coverage helped insulate the parent from severe crises when a certain region experienced economic difficulties.

=== Nazi era 1933-1945 ===
Expansion continued during World War II. A BBC subsidiary, Stotz-Kontakt GmbH, in Mannheim, Germany, used forced labor to expand operations.

=== After World War II ===
After World War II, the Cold War presented a variety of business opportunities for defense-related electrical contractors, but Brown Boveri's subsidiaries were seen as foreign companies in many of the countries in which they operated, sometimes making it difficult for the company to win lucrative contracts involving sensitive technology and other government contracts. The company, nevertheless, excelled at power generation, including nuclear power generators, and prospered in this field. Electrification in the Third World also provided Brown Boveri with substantial profits.

== Reorganization of Brown Boveri in 1970 ==
In 1970 Brown Boveri acquired Maschinenfabrik Oerlikon and began an extensive reorganization. The company's subsidiaries were divided into five groups: German, French, Swiss, "medium-sized" (seven manufacturing bases in Europe and Latin America), and Brown Boveri International (the remaining facilities). Each of these groups was further broken down into five product divisions: power generation, electronics, electric power distribution, traction equipment, and industrial equipment.

=== The United States ===
Throughout the 1970s, Brown Boveri struggled to expand into the US market. The company negotiated a joint venture with Rockwell, the American manufacturer of high-tech military and aerospace applications, but the deal collapsed when the two companies could not agree on financial terms. Brown Boveri had a handful of major U.S. customers as its clients, among them large utilities such as the Tennessee Valley Authority and American Electric Power's Nuclear Plant in southwest Michigan DC Cook Unit 2 steam turbine. Brown Boveri's American market share was low considering the company's international standing (North American sales accounted for only 3.5% of total sales in 1974 and 1975), and the company continued to seek entry into U.S. markets.

=== Great Britain ===
During the electrification of the British West Coast Main Line in the early 1970s, Brown Boveri traction insulators were used.

In July 1974, Brown Boveri offered to buy 53% of British controls and instrument manufacturer, George Kent, Limited. The deal at first raised concern in Britain over foreign ownership of such highly sensitive technology although the Brown Boveri offer proposed moving George Kent's scientific and medical business into a separate company. In September 1974, the General Electric Company (GEC) put in a counter offer and the British Government and The Rank Organisation, who together had a large shareholding in George Kent, preferred the GEC offer and signified their intent to accept it. Brown Boveri prevailed after reducing their proposed participation to 49% of George Kent and increasing their cash injection, together with the encouragement of George Kent's rank-and-file employees, who feared the alternative of being bought by GEC. The newly acquired company was renamed Brown Boveri Kent with The Rank Organisation holding an almost 9% interest in the expanded group.

=== The Middle East and Africa ===
In the mid-1970s growing demand in the Middle East for large power-generating facilities distracted the company from its push into North America. Oil-rich African nations, like Nigeria, attempting to diversify their manufacturing capabilities also created new markets for Brown Boveri's heavy electrical engineering expertise.

== The 1980s ==
In the early 1980s Brown Boveri's sales flattened out and the company's earnings declined. In 1983 Brown Boveri's German subsidiary in Mannheim, West Germany, which accounted for nearly half of the entire parent company's sales, rebounded. In spite of an increase in orders, the company's cost structure kept earnings down. In 1985 the subsidiary's performance improved as a result of cost-cutting measures but price decreases in the international market and unfavorable shifts in currency exchanges rates largely offset these gains. In 1986 the parent company acquired a significant block of shares in the Mannheim subsidiary, bringing its total stake to 75 percent.

=== Unification of research ===
In the later 1980s Brown Boveri took steps to reduce duplication of research and development among its various groups. While each subsidiary continued to do some product-development research for its individual market, theoretical research was unified under the parent company, making more efficient use of research funding.

=== Supercharger development ===
In 1987 the company introduced a supercharging system for diesel engines called Comprex. This system was capable of increasing an engine's horsepower by 35% and delivering up to 50% more torque at lower speeds. Japanese automaker Mazda planned to use the supercharger in its diesel passenger models.

=== Merger ===
In January 1988, Brown Boveri merged with ASEA to form Asea Brown Boveri.

== Locomotives and railcars ==
=== Electric ===
- SBB-CFF-FFS RABDe 12/12
- SBB-CFF-FFS RBe 540
- SBB-CFF-FFS RBDe 560
- PRR O1

=== Gas turbine ===
- SBB-CFF-FFS Am 4/6 1101
- British Rail 18000

== Trams ==
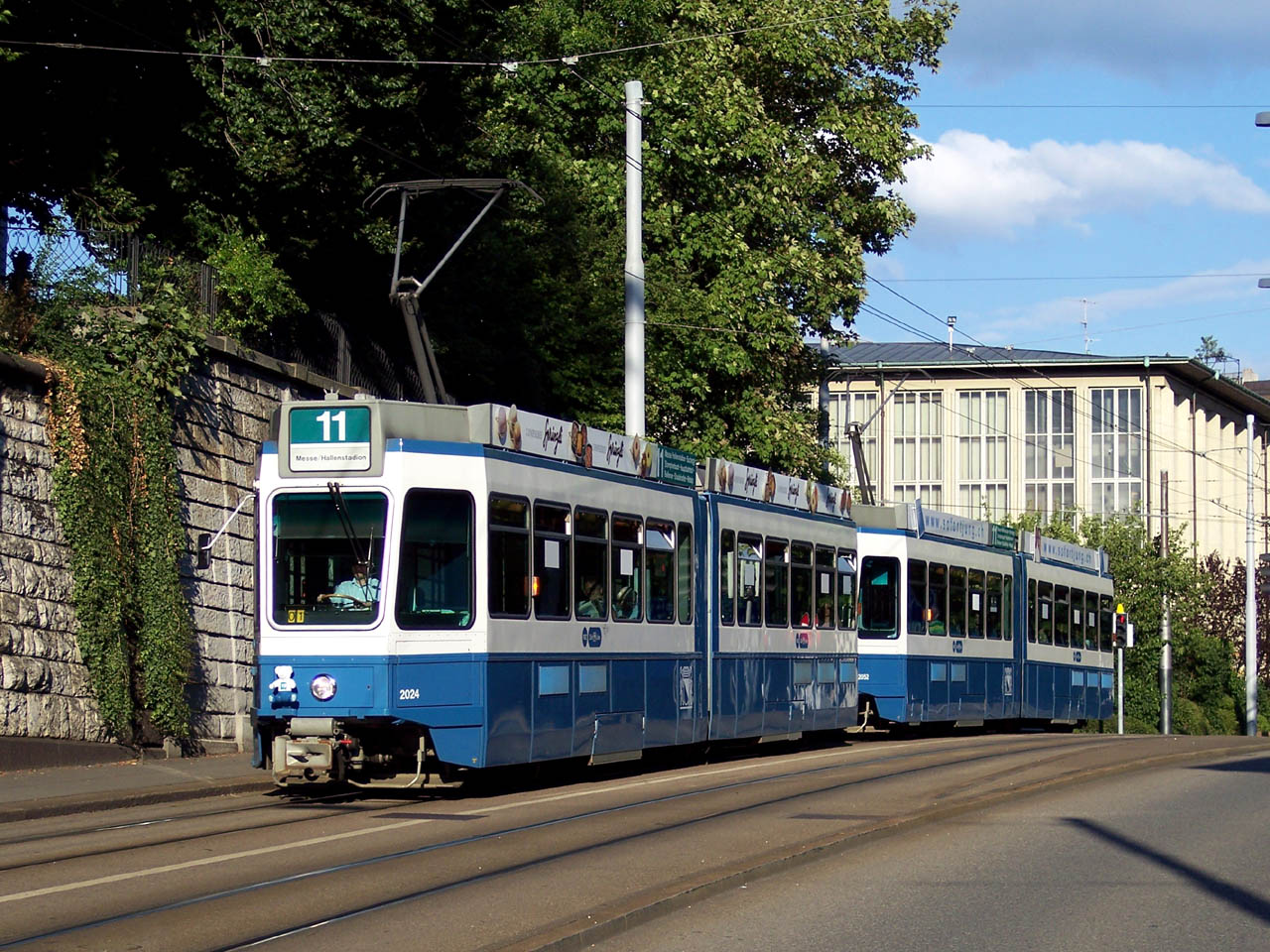

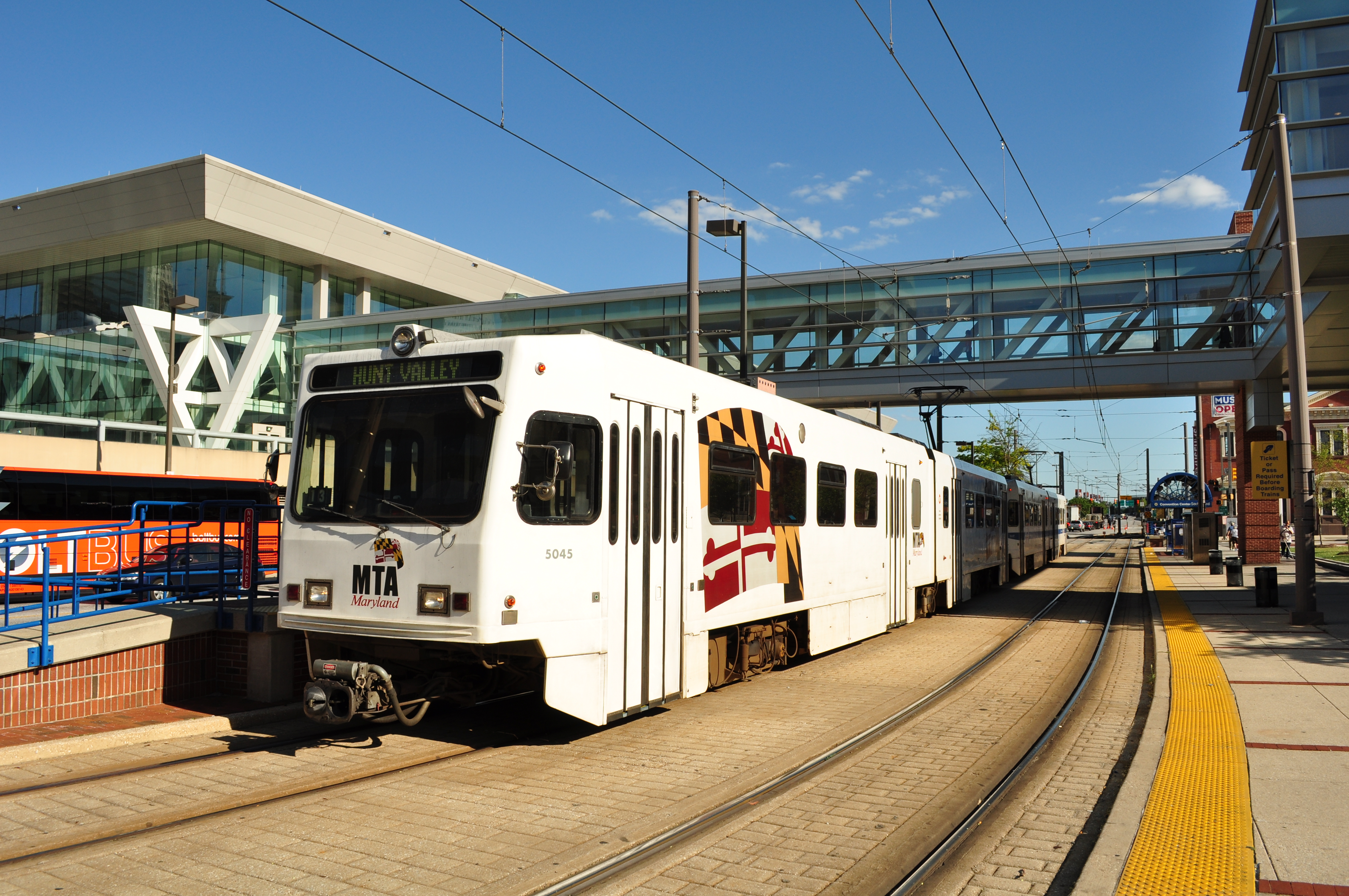
- Tram 2000
- Baltimore Light Rail LRV

== Gallery ==
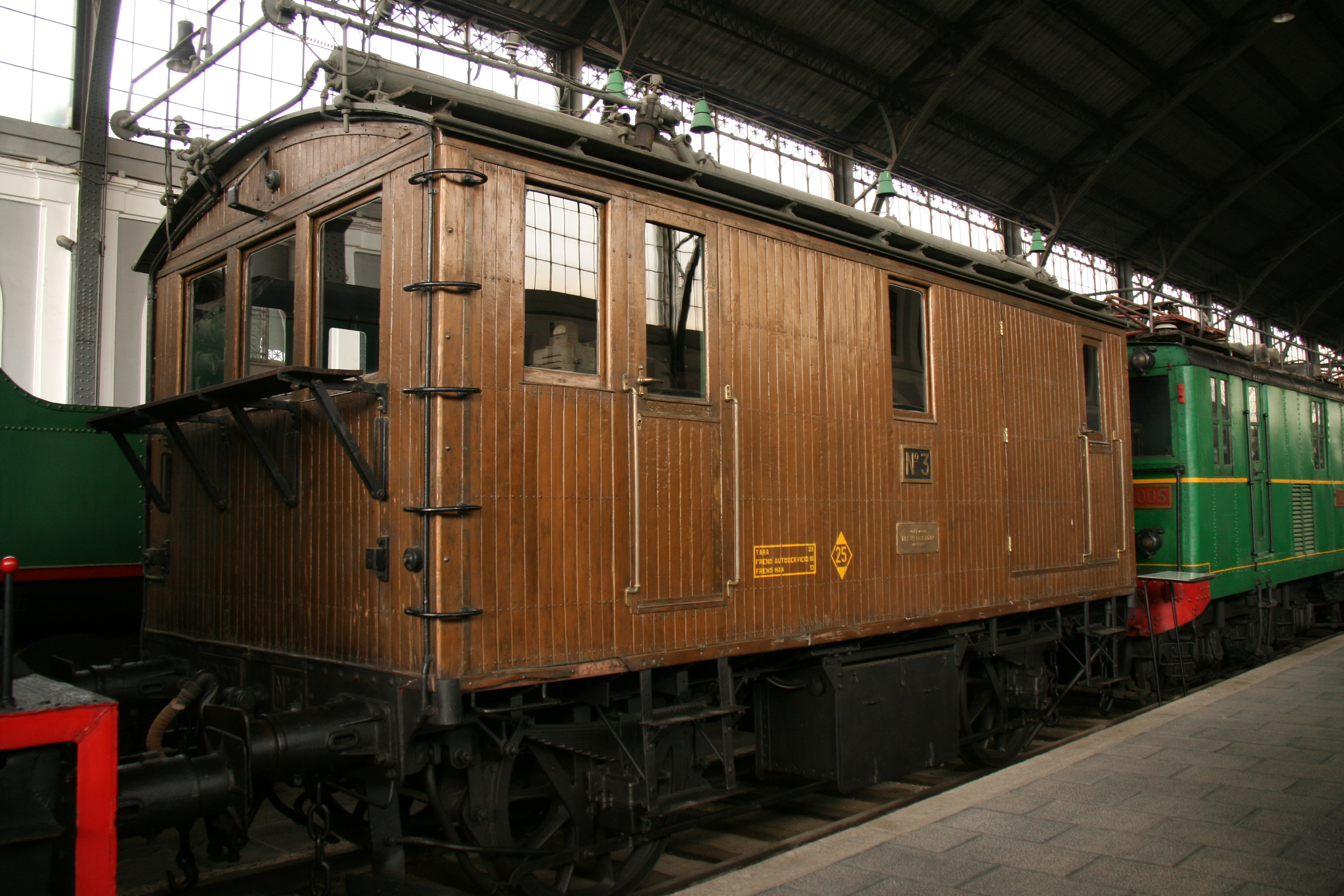
Brown Boveri electric locomotive of 1911

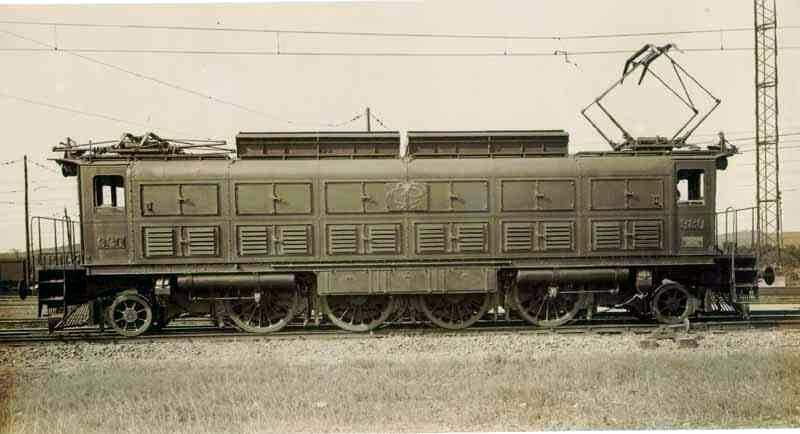
Brown Boveri electric locomotive of 1929

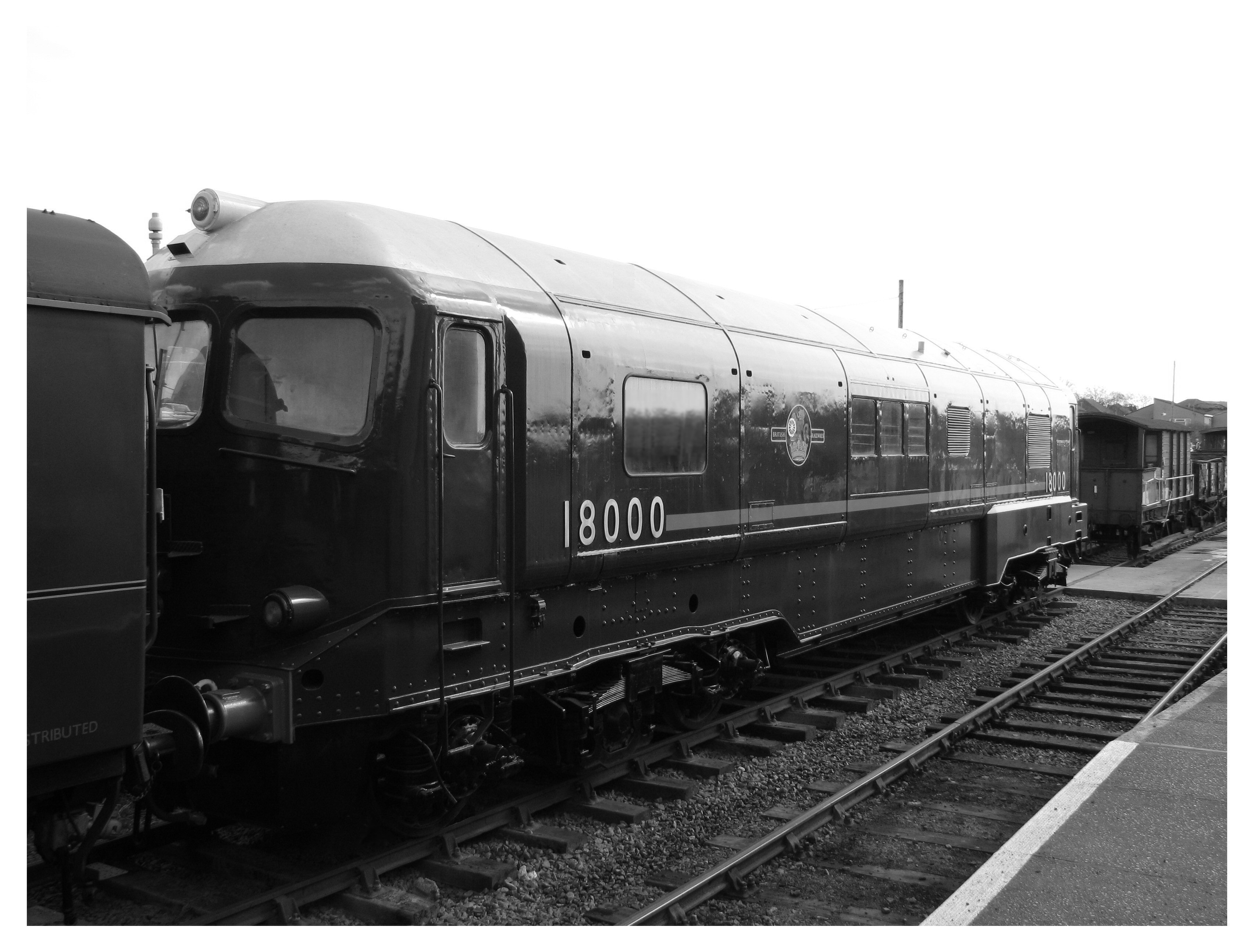
Brown Boveri gas turbine-electric locomotive, British Rail 18000, built 1949

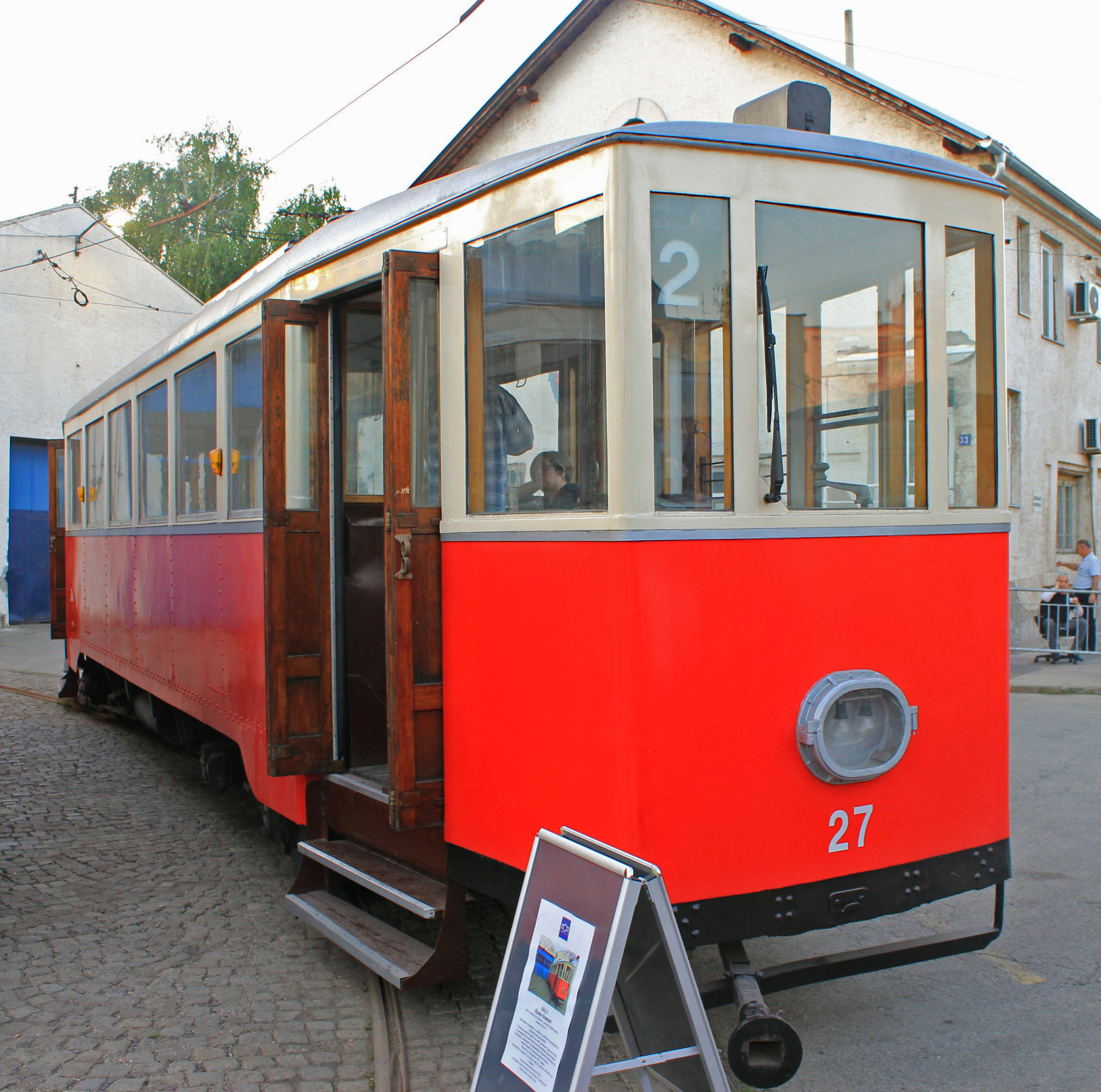
Brown, Boveri & Cie tram from pre-WWII period in Belgrade, Serbia

== See also ==
- Norsk Elektrisk & Brown Boveri
- Société Anonyme des Ateliers de Sécheron
