= Société Anonyme des Ateliers de Sécheron =

Swiss electrical engineering company (1918–1988)

- The SAAS factory in 1925
- Company type: Joint-stock company
- Industry: Electrical engineering
- Founded: 9 July 1918
- Founder: Alfred de Meuron
- Defunct: 1989
- Fate: Split into four companies
- Successor: ABB Sécheron SA; ABB Power Generation; ABB Systèmes de Transport; Sécheron SA
- Headquarters: Geneva, Switzerland
- Area served: Europe, South America, Africa
- Products: Electrical equipment

The Société Anonyme des Ateliers de Sécheron (SAAS, 'Anonymous Society of Sécheron Workshops') was a joint-stock company based in Geneva, Switzerland. It specialized in electrical engineering, including the manufacture of electrical equipment and locomotives.

In 1989, the company was split into four successor companies, ABB Sécheron SA, ABB Power Generation (closed in 1995), ABB Systèmes de Transport and Sécheron SA.

== History ==
In 1879, Alfred de Meuron set up a small workshop in Geneva to manufacture electrical appliances. This workshop ultimately formed the basis for the establishment of SAAS on 9 July 1918.

The following year, 1919, Brown Boveri & Cie (BBC) became SAAS's main shareholder. Five years later, SAAS resumed its independence. The company remained independent until 1969, when competitive pressures forced it to seek new partners. In 1970, BBC took over as sole shareholder. However, the company's name was changed only in 1982, when it became BBC Sécheron SA.

In 1988, BBC finally merged with the Swedish company ASEA to form ASEA Brown Boveri (now ABB Group). The new company chose to split SAAS into four companies, and separate itself from the traction-related manufacturing sector. The decision led to the creation in 1989 of a new independent company, Sécheron SA, which re-entered that sector. Meanwhile, ABB Sécheron SA continued the manufacturing of transformers.

In 1992, ABB Sécheron moved out of its previous factory, and let Sécheron SA occupy the original site alone.

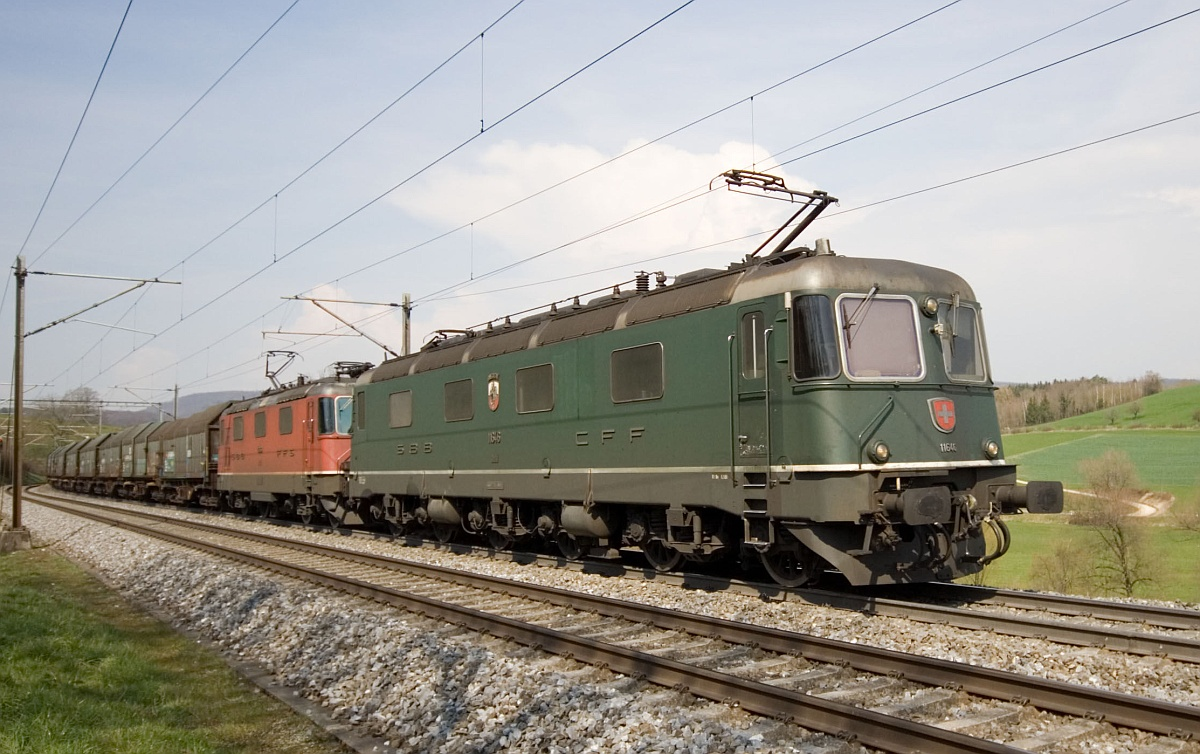
The SBB-CFF-FFS Re 4/4 II (left) and Re 6/6 (right) were SAAS products.

== Products ==
The company manufactured the following products:

- Electrodes for arc welding;
- Mercury-arc valves;
- Electrical equipment for hydroelectric power stations;
- Electric locomotives, in collaboration with other companies (BBC, SLM or SIG): e.g., Re 4/4 I, Re 4/4 II and III, Re 6/6;
- Electric railcars and multiple units, also in collaboration with other companies;
- Speed controllers for trains, rapid transit networks, trams and trolleybuses.

== See also ==
- Bern-Lötschberg-Simplon railway
- Brig-Visp-Zermatt-Bahn
- Furka Oberalp Bahn
- Rhaetian Railway
- SBB-CFF-FFS
