= SBB Re 420 =

Class of Swiss electric locomotives

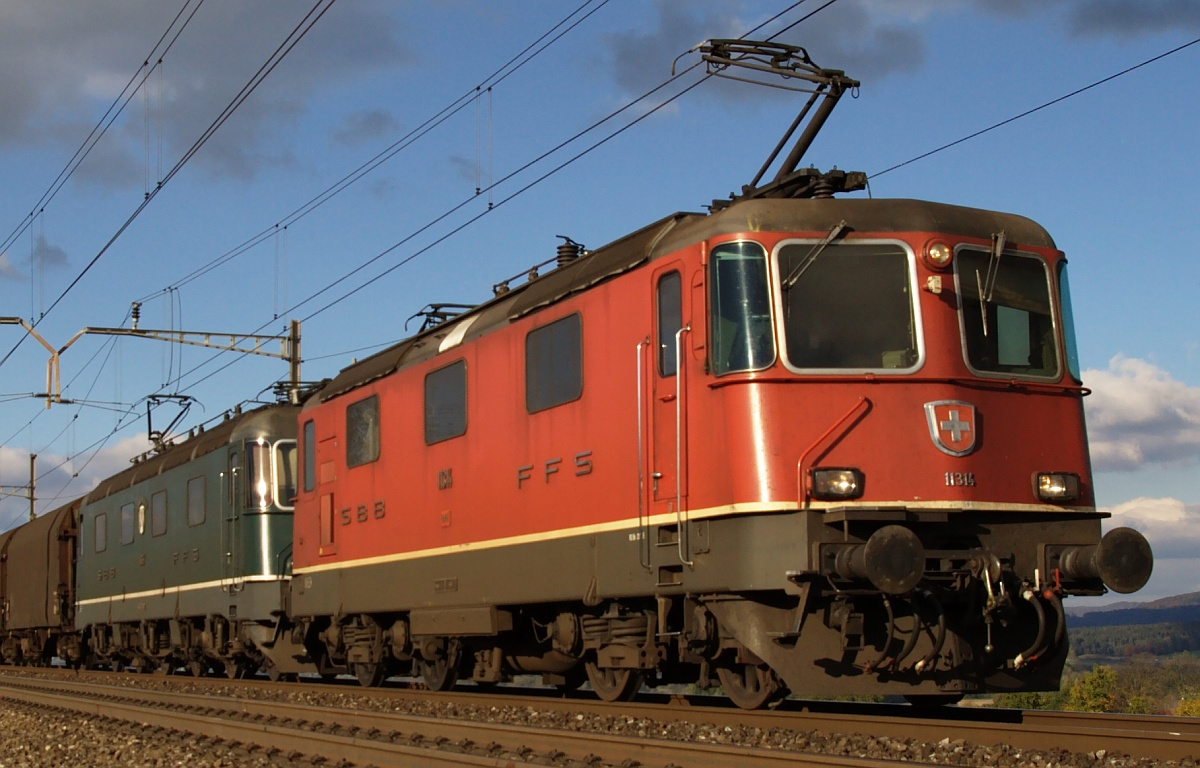
- Re 420 together with an Re 620
Type and origin
- Power type: Electric
- Builder: SLM Winterthur; BBC Baden; MFO Zürich; SAAS Geneva
- Build date: 1964, 1967–1985
- Total produced: 277 Re 4/4^{II} 26 Re 4/4^{III}
Specifications
- Configuration
  - AAR: B-B
  - UIC: Bo′Bo′
- Gauge: 1,435 mm / 4 ft 8 1/2 in standard gauge
- Length: 15,410 mm (50 ft 6 3/4 in) over buffers
- Width: 2,970 mm (9 ft 8 7/8 in)
- Height: 4,500 mm (14 ft 9 1/8 in)
- Loco weight: 80–85 tonnes (79–84 long tons; 88–94 short tons)
- Electric system/s: 15 kV 16 2/3 Hz AC Catenary
- Current pickup: Pantograph
- Loco brake: Air and Dynamic
Performance figures
- Maximum speed: 140 km/h (87 mph) Re 4/4^{II} 125 km/h (78 mph) Re 4/4III
- Power output: 4,700 kW (6,300 hp)
- Tractive effort: Continuous: 150 kN (34,000 lbf) @105 km/h (65 mph), Maximum: 255 kN (57,000 lbf)
- Brakeforce: 135 kN (30,000 lbf)
Career
- Operators: SBB, BLS, SOB, RM, MBC, MThB, Travys, CR, WRS
- Class: Re 4/4^{II}, later Re 420 and Re 421; Re 4/4^{III}, later Re 430 (Re 436)
- Numbers: Re 4/4^{II}: 11101–11349, 11371–11397 (later SBB 420 101–349, 421 371–397, partly BLS, MBC, MThB, Travys and SOB); BLS 420 501–512; Re 4/4^{III}: 11350–11370 (later SBB 430 350–370), WRS 430 111, 112, 114, 115 (previously RM/CR 436 111–115)
- Nicknames: Bo'Bo'
- Disposition: see tables

The Re 420, originally and still widely called Re 4/4^{II}, are a series of versatile standard gauge electric locomotives of Swiss Federal Railways (SBB CFF FFS), but are also used by BLS AG (BLS Re 420.5) and private companies (previously also by the Swiss Südostbahn, SOB). They were produced over a period of 21 years, from 1964 to 1985, and are currently used mainly for freight operations but still also for some push-pull passenger train services. It is the largest series of locomotives of Swiss Federal Railways, and they are the most common type of locomotive in Switzerland.

The Re 420 LION are refurbished Re 420 engines used for peak-hour commuter rail services of Zurich S-Bahn.

The Re 421 is an upgraded version built for cross-border operations.

The Re 430 (Re 436 of private companies), originally known as the Re 4/4^{III}, are a derivative of the Re 420, modified for higher traction but lower speed.

== Operations ==
As of 2024, the four-axle Re 420 are mainly used for freight services, where they are sometimes paired with the six-axle Re 620 (Re 6/6), especially in mountainous regions. This pairing is referred to as Re 10/10. (Note: both locomotives are Re class, so the couple is Re class; 10/10 means that they overall have 10 driven axles out of 10) Current freight operators using the Re 420 are SBB Cargo and Widmer Rail Service AG (WRS).

Before the wide use of electric multiple units, the Re 420 was frequently used for passenger services, either as a single engine or in pairs. It is still in use for some passenger train services, for example for some peak-hour commuter rail services of Zurich S-Bahn, the EuroCity Transalpin or the tourist-oriented Gotthard Panorama Express.

As of 2024, most standard gauge push-pull operations of passenger trains in Switzerland are run with Re 460 locomotives (Re 450 on the Zurich S-Bahn network).

=== Former Swiss Express ===
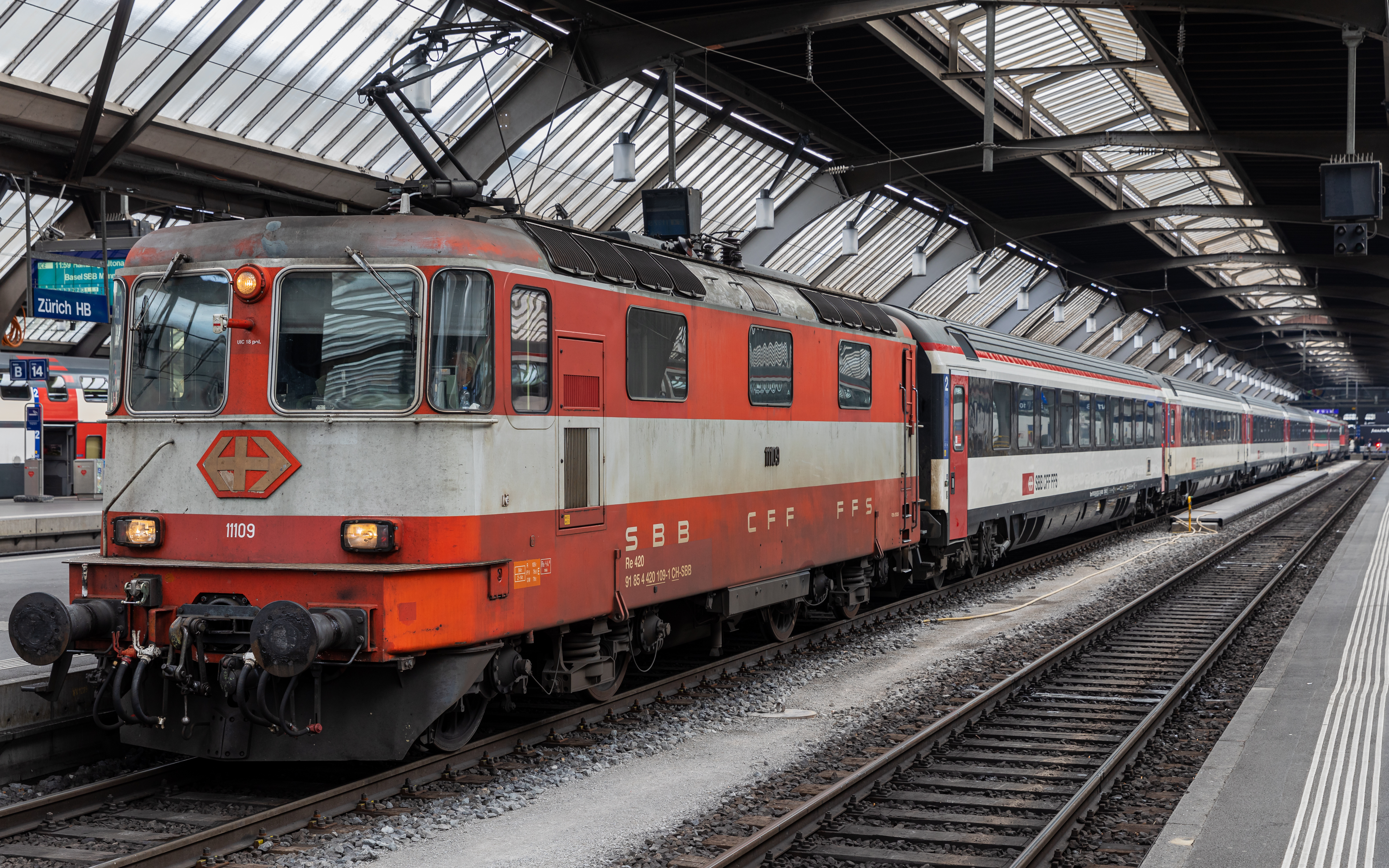
Re 420 109-1 with Swiss Express livery at Zurich HB in 2022

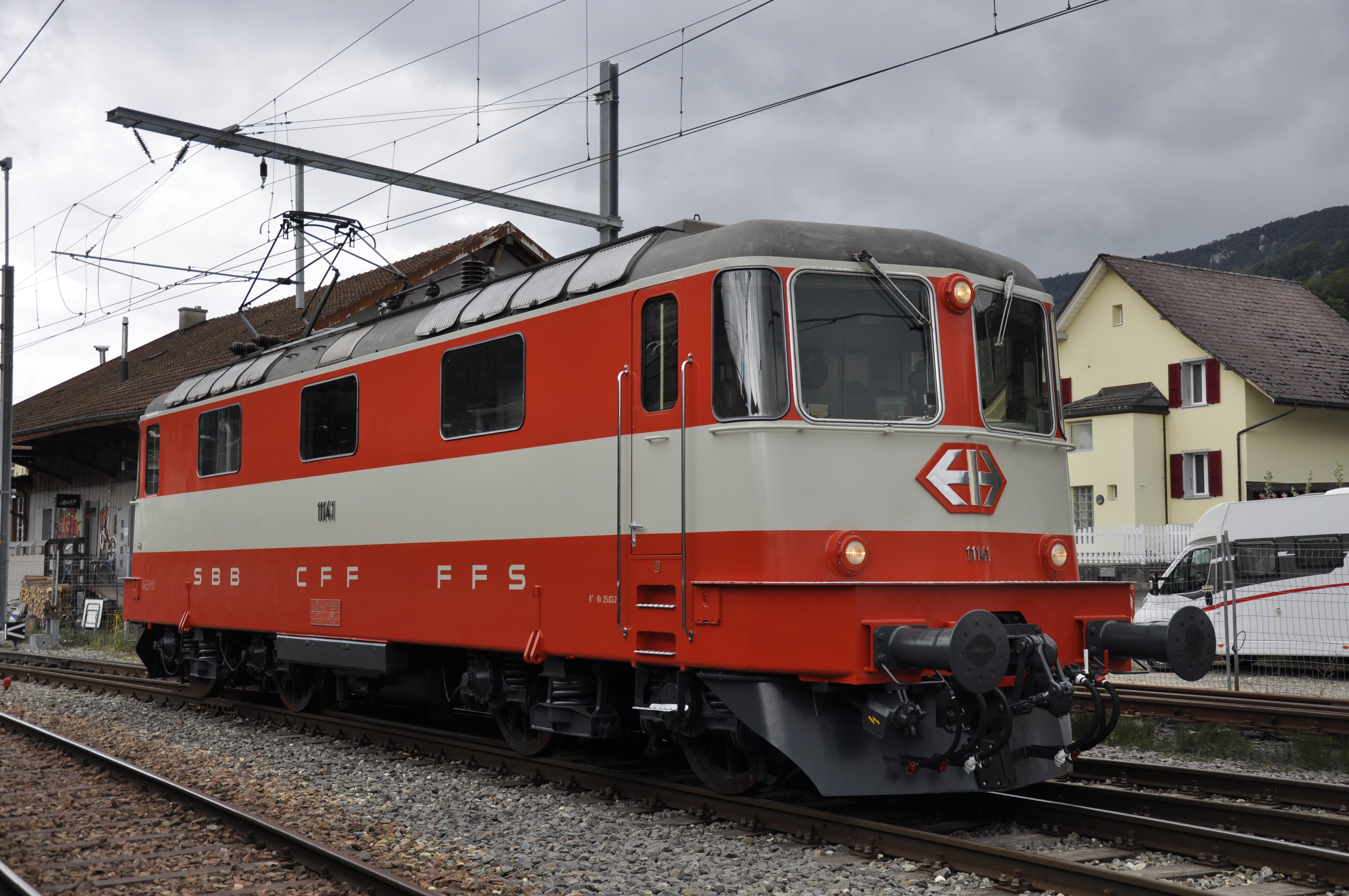
Restored Re 4/4^{II} 11141 of DSF

Between 22 May 1975 and 28 May 1982, Swiss Federal Railways ran trainsets composed of Re 4/4^{II} engines and Einheitswagen III (lit. 'standard carriage III') as Swiss Express on the Geneva—Lausanne—Bern—Zurich—St. Gallen(—Rorschach) line. For these services, locomotives Re 4/4^{II} 11103, 11106, 11108, 11109, 11112, 11113, 11133 and 11141 had to be adapted accordingly, as the wagons were delivered with automatic couplings. The locomotives of the later series (from 11220, but without 11236–11238) were already prepared at the factory to accept the UIC coupling. However, since these were not yet available at the time, some Re 420 locomotives had to be converted specifically for the Swiss Express. They received an extended shock beam, new couplings and the appropriate paint in the Swiss Express colors orange-stone gray-orange. They also bear the then newly introduced SBB logo (the Swiss cross with two arrows) instead of the typical Swiss coat of arms on their fronts. The length over the buffers was then 15,570 mm (613 in) instead of the usual 15,410 mm (607 in). The automatic coupling protruded over the buffers, resulting in a total length of 16,030 mm (631 in). With the adaptation of the Einheitswagen III for shuttle train operation, the ends of the compositions were given normal screw couplings, and subsequently the locomotives too.

On the occasion of major overhauls, locomotives № 11112, 11113 and 11133 were painted red; № 11103 and 11106 were taken over by the BLS and painted in their typical silver-blue-green livery. The 11141 retained the Swiss Express livery and was parked at the beginning of October 2007 and has been used as a heating locomotive ever since. After a general inspection in Bellinzona, the engine has been back in use since autumn 2009 in the red livery of the series, but keeping the SBB logo at the fronts. It was later sold to DSF Koblenz which restored its original Swiss Express look. Locomotive 11108 has been parked since 25 September 2020 due to expired deadlines and is now in the SBB Historic Depot in Olten. Re 4/4^{II} 11133 is an ICN shunting locomotive in the Yverdon-les-Bains main workshop and has an additional beam with automatic coupling on one side instead of the screw coupling and buffer.

As of 2025, locomotive 11109 (420 109-1) is the last one with the original Swiss Express scheme still in operation for passenger train services. Built in 1966, it is currently also the oldest operating Re 420 of Swiss Federal Railways.

=== Zurich S-Bahn (Re 420 LION) ===
Between 2011 and 2016, 30 Re 420 locomotives of the passenger division (Re 4/4^{II} 11201–11230) were refurbished for peak-hour services on the Zurich S-Bahn network (renumbered Re 420 201–230). Each set is composed of six or ten DPZ double-deck cars plus one Re 420 LION locomotive at each end (head and tail configuration). The acronym LION stands for Lifting, Integration, Optimierung, Neugestaltung (in German, lit. 'facelift, integration, optimization, reconfiguration'). These trainsets are currently in use as S19, S21 or S23 services, among others.

=== Cross-border operations (Re 421) ===
Six Re 4/4^{II} (vehicle numbers 11196–11201; later 11195–11200) were equipped with a wider pantograph wiper in order to conform with Deutsche Bahn (DB) and Austrian Federal Railways (ÖBB) standards, which subsequently allowed these units to pull EuroCity (EC) trains over the borders to Bregenz (Austria) and Lindau (Germany). These workings were covered by the last series, engines 11371–11397, which were rebuilt for use in Germany and Austria, not only with a different pantograph but also with PZB/Indusi and other systems necessary for use abroad. These locomotives are classified Re 421 and are lettered for SBB Cargo but they also pulled passenger trains to Bregenz and Lindau (however, 11382 was never converted as it was already withdrawn with fire damage). Some Re 421s were later bought by Widmer Rail Services AG (WRS).

With the December 2020 timetable change, in conjunction with the reopening of Lindau-Reutin station and electrification of the line to Munich, services between Zürich HB and Munich Central Station were no longer hauled by locomotives, but instead New Pendolino EMUs of SBB started operations on this line as EC/ECE.

== Re 430 subseries ==
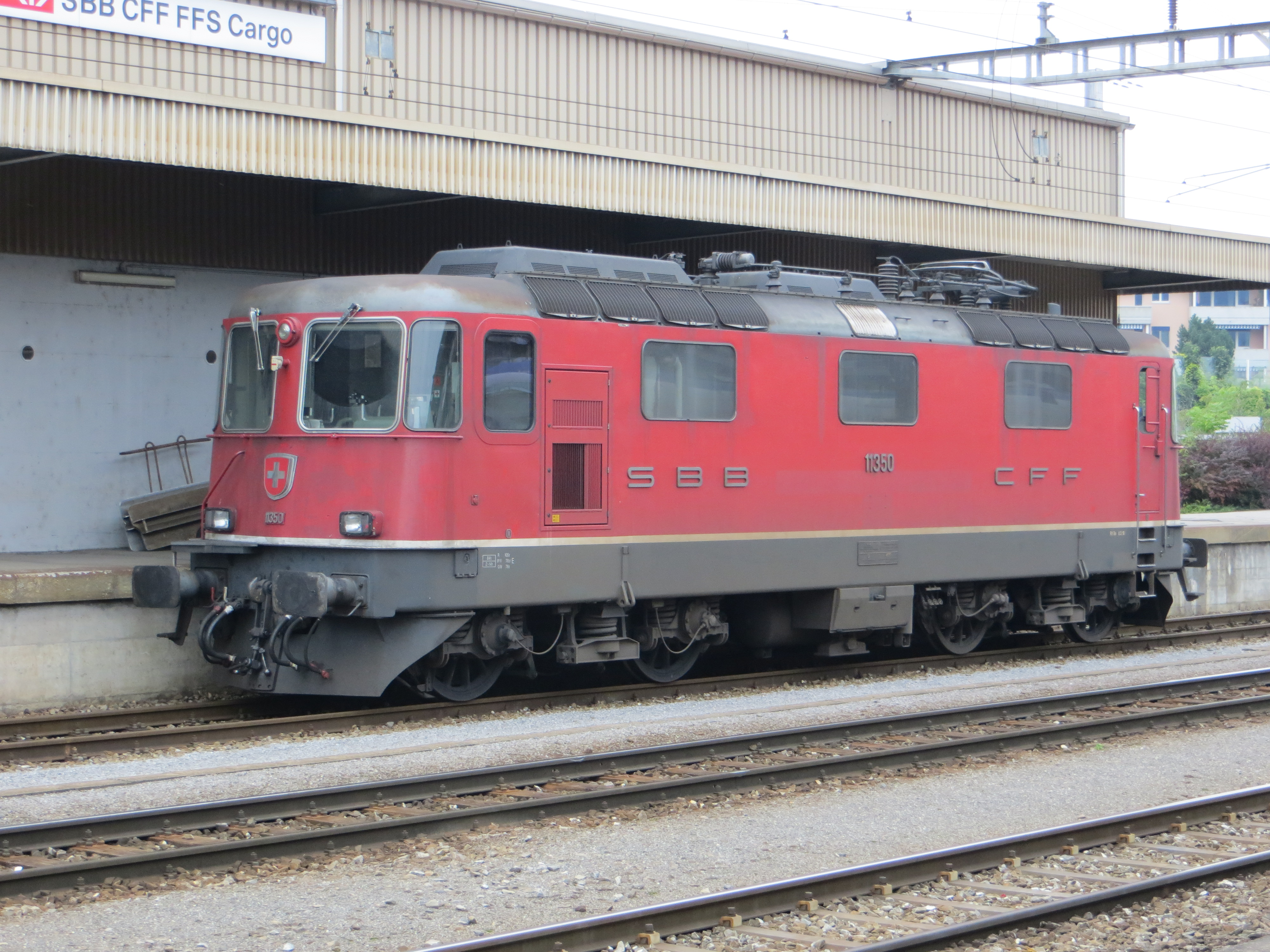
SBB Re 4/4^{III} 11350 ex SOB Re 4/4 41

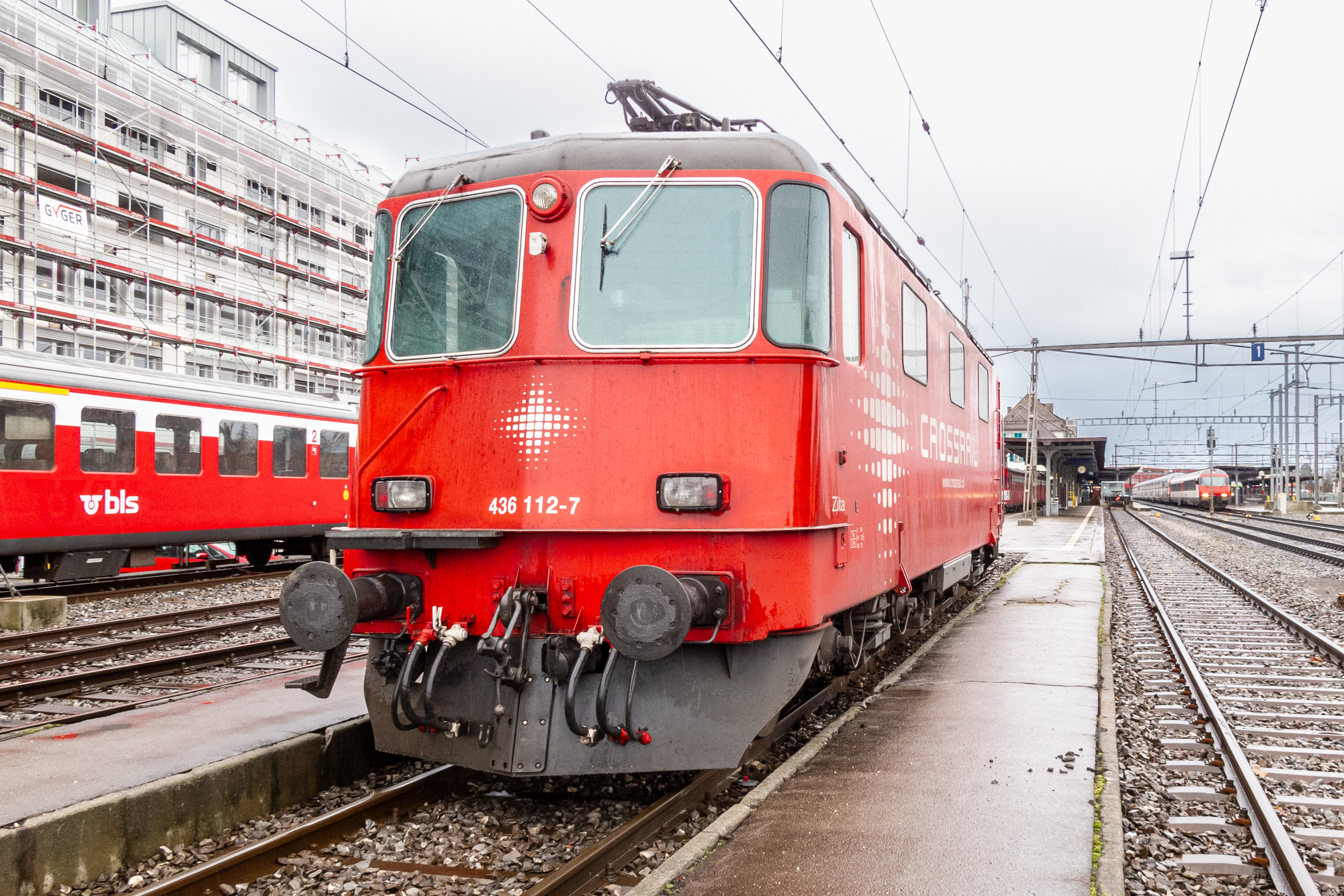
Crossrail Re 436 112 in Thun

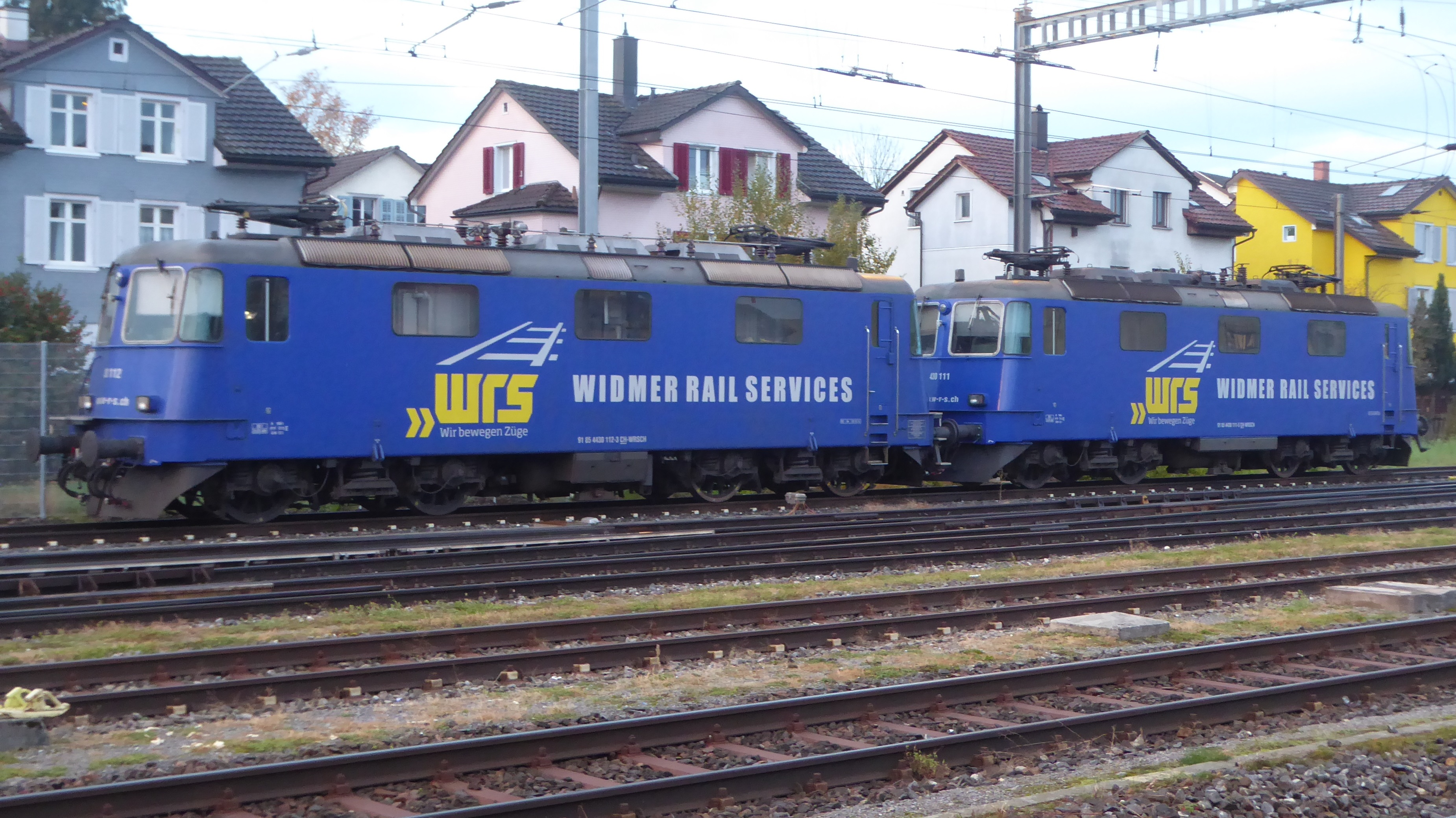
Re 430 112 and 111 of WRS

When the former Südostbahn (SOB) had the opportunity to buy one of the first batch of 50 Re 4/4^{II} locomotives before delivery, it had the gear modified for higher traction and lower speed for the steep routes on their network. This locomotive was delivered as SOB Re 4/4 41, which later became SBB Re 4/4^{III} 11350 (or Re 430 350-9 with the new classification scheme).

Based on the SOB experience, the SBB ordered a batch of 20 Re 4/4^{III} in 1969 for use on the Gotthard route. Three of those locomotives were sold to the SOB in the 1980s and renumbered Re 4/4 42–44. These locomotives were returned to the SBB between 1996 and 1998 in exchange for the four prototype Re 4/4^{IV}, which, renamed as SOB Re 446, have push-pulled coaches of the Voralpen Express, along with the SOB Re 456 until 2019 (since then Südostbahn uses Traverso EMUs).

The predecessors of the Regionalverkehr Mittelland (EBT, VHB and SMB) ordered a total of five Re 4/4^{III}, Re 436 111–113, 141 and 181. These locomotives were later renumbered (111–115) and worked for Crossrail AG until that company was dissolved in 2017. Engines numbered 111, 112, 114 and 115 were then sold to Widmer Rail Services AG (WRS) and renamed Re 430. Locomotive Re 436 113 was involved in an accident in 2010 and was scrapped in September 2017.

== Stock ==
=== Re 4/4^{II} (Re 420, Re 421) ===
The 267 Re 4/4^{II} locomotives were delivered in seven series: 11101–11106 (prototypes), 11107–11155, 11156–11215, 11216–11254, 11255–11304, 11305–11349 and 11371–11397. In an effort to unify the numbering of their motive power and in UIC compliance, Swiss Federal Railways changed the class name of the Re 4/4^{II} to Re 420 and, accordingly, also the numbering of their locomotives was adjusted.

On 1 September 1999, locomotives numbered Re 4/4^{II} 11101–11155, 11181, 11191–11270 and 11299–11304 were assigned to the SBB passenger division, and 11156–11171, 11173–11180, 11182–11190, 11271–11298, 11305–11311, 11313–11349 and 11371–11397 to the freight division (becoming SBB Cargo afterwards). At the end of 2002, locomotive 11172^{II} (ex-MThB) joined the passenger fleet. One year later, 11225–11264 changed to SBB Cargo. At the end of 2004, vehicle numbers 11225–11230 were changed to 11265–11270, and six locomotives were sold to BLS (see list). One year later, locomotives 11102–11107 followed. They were replaced in the passenger fleet by 11156–11159, 11161 and 11164 from SBB Cargo.

In total, 96 locomotives are owned by the passenger division, six by BLS (Re 420 501–506, ex SBB Re 4/4^{II} 11110, 11117, 11119, 11123, 11137 and 11142) and all others by SBB Cargo. Several locomotives have been withdrawn from service and scrapped. The following is an inventory list of all Re 4/4^{II} with further information:

List of Re 4/4^{II} locomotives
Engine №	Colour	Withdrawn	Scrapped	Notes	Image
11101	Red	May 2014	April 2015	SBB CFF FFS label on the side was placed lower than in the others	
11102	Pine green	April 2010	April 2010	Sold to BLS in December 2005, renamed BLS Re 420 508-4, withdrawn in September 2009 as surplus	
11103	Orange-gray	April 2010	April 2010	Ex-Swiss Express, sold to BLS in December 2005, renamed BLS Re 420 509-2, received BLS colour scheme, withdrawn in September 2009 as surplus	
11104	Red	February 2010	February 2010	Sold to BLS in December 2005, renamed BLS Re 420 510-0, received BLS colour scheme, withdrawn in September 2009 as surplus	
11105	Pine green	April 2010	April 2010	Sold to BLS in December 2005, renamed BLS Re 420 511-8, withdrawn in September 2009 as surplus	
11106	Red	February 2010	February 2010	Ex-Swiss Express, sold to BLS in December 2005, renamed BLS Re 420 512-6, received BLS colour scheme, withdrawn in September 2009 as surplus	
11107	Red	May 2014	April 2015	Sold to BLS in December 2005, renamed BLS Re 420 507-6, withdrawn in September 2009 as surplus	
11108 (420 108-3)	Orange-gray	—	—	Ex-Swiss Express	
11109 (420 109-1)	Orange-gray	—	—	Ex-Swiss Express	
11110	Green-blue-silver	June 2022	—	Sold to BLS in December 2004, renamed BLS Re 420 501-9, received BLS colour scheme. Sold to Extrazug.ch in June 2022, will receive original colour scheme	
11111 (420 111-7)	Red	—	—		
11112 (420 112-5)	Red	—	—		
11113	Red	October 2003	August 2004	Accident in Zurich Oerlikon on 24 October 2003	
11114 (420 114-1)	Red	—	—		
11115 (420 115-8)	Red	—	—		
11116 (420 116-6)	Red	—	—		
11117	Pine green	—	—	Sold to BLS in December 2004, renamed BLS Re 420 502-7, sold to Widmer Rail Services AG (WRS) in February 2022	
11118 (420 118-2)	Red	—	—		
11119	Pine green	—	—	Sold to BLS in December 2004, renamed BLS Re 420 503-5, sold to Travys in January 2013	
11120	Red	June 2019	June 2019		
11121 (420 121-6)	Red	November 2023	November 2023		
11122 (420 122-4)	Red	October 2021	October 2021		
11123	Pine green	—	—	Sold to BLS in December 2004, renamed BLS Re 420 504-3, sold to Widmer Rail Services AG (WRS) in February 2022	
11124 (420 124-0)	Red	April 2022	April 2022		
11125 (420 125-7)	Red	November 2021	November 2021		
11126 (420 126-5)	Red	—	—		
11127 (420 127-3)	Red	—	—		
11128 (420 128-1)	Red	August 2021	August 2021		
11129 (420 129-9)	Red	November 2021	November 2021		
11130 (420 130-7)	Red	—	—		
11131 (420 131-5)	Red	April 2022	April 2022		
11132 (420 132-3)	Red	December 2021	December 2021		
11133 (420 133-1)	Red	—	—	ex-Swiss Express	
11134 (420 134-9)	Red	December 2021	December 2021		
11135 (420 135-6)	Red	June 2021	June 2021		
11136 (420 136-4)	Red	—	—		
11137	Pine green	January 2018	June 2019	Sold to BLS in December 2004, renamed BLS Re 420 505-5	
11138 (420 138-0)	Red	October 2021	October 2021		
11139 (420 139-8)	Red	—	—		
11140 (420 140-6)	Red	March 2023	March 2023		
11141 (420 141-4)	Orange-gray	December 2022	—	Ex-Swiss Express, painted red in September 2009, sold to DSF Koblenz in December 2022, received original Swiss Express look including round headlights	
11142	Pine green	—	—	Sold to BLS in December 2004, renamed BLS Re 420 506-8, sold to MBC in January 2013	
11143 (420 143-0)	Red	—	—		
11144 (420 144-8)	Red	—	—		
11145 (420 145-5)	Red	November 2023	—		
11146 (420 146-3)	Red	—	—		
11147 (420 147-7)	Red	April 2024	April 2024		
11148 (420 148-9)	Red	2022	—	Sold to DSF Koblenz in 2022	
11149 (420 149-7)	Red	—	—		
11150 (420 150-5)	Red	April 2021	April 2021		
11151 (420 151-3)	Red	April 2021	April 2021		
11152 (420 152-1)	Red	—	—		
11153 (420 153-9)	Red	—	—		
11154 (420 154-7)	Red	—	—		
11155 (420 155-4)	Red	June 2021	June 2021		
11156 (420 156-2)	Red	—	—	Upgraded with ETCS level 2	
11157 (420 157-0)	Red	—	—	Upgraded with ETCS level 2	
11158 (420 158-8)	Red	—	—	Upgraded with ETCS level 2	
11159 (420 159-6)	Red	—	—	Upgraded with ETCS level 2	
11160 (420 160-4)	Red-blue	—	—	Assigned to SBB Cargo	
11161 (420 161-2)	Pine green	—	—	Upgraded with ETCS level 2	
11162 (420 162-0)	Red	—	—		
11163 (420 163-8)	Red	March 2023	March 2023		
11164 (420 164-6)	Red	—	—	Upgraded with ETCS level 2	
11165 (420 165-3)	Red-blue	February 2021	February 2021	Assigned to SBB Cargo, change of livery	
11166	Red	September 2019	September 2019		
11167 (420 167-9)	Red	—	—		
11168	Red	May 2018	May 2018		
11169 (420 169-5)	Red-blue	January 2022	January 2022	Assigned to SBB Cargo	
11170 (420 170-3)	Red-blue	June 2018	June 2018	Assigned to SBB Cargo	
11171	Red	June 2018	June 2018		
11172^{I}	Pine green	09 December 1978	31 December 1978	Accident in Vaumarcus on 09 December 1978	
11172^{II} (420 172-9)	Red	—	—	Bought from Mittelthurgaubahn (MThB) in February 2002. Painted red in December 2002, Swiss coat of arms painted. Upgraded with ETCS level 2	
11173 (420 173-7)	Red	August 2020	—	Sold to DSF Koblenz in 2022	
11174	Red	May 2018	May 2018		
11175	Red	February 2018	February 2018		
11176	Red	February 2018	February 2018		
11177	Red	December 2018	December 2018		
11178 (420 178-6)	Red-blue	June 2021	June 2021	Assigned to SBB Cargo	
11179	Red	September 2016	September 2016	Derailment in April 2016 at Stein-Säckingen	
11180	Red	February 2018	February 2018		
11181 (420 181-0)	Red	—	—	Upgraded with ETCS level 2. Zugkraft Aargau special livery	
11182	Red	March 2018	March 2018		
11183	Red	December 2018	December 2018		
11184	Red	July 2015	July 2015	Accident in October 2011 in Olten	
11185	Red	April 2018	April 2018		
11186 (420 186-9)	Red-blue	June 2021	June 2021	Assigned to SBB Cargo	
11187	Red	September 2018	September 2018		
11188	Red	May 2018	May 2018		
11189	Red	May 2018	May 2018		
11190	Red	April 2018	April 2018		
11191 (420 191-9)	Red	—	—	Named 'Depot G'. Upgraded with ETCS level 2	
11192 (420 192-7)	Red	—	—	Upgraded with ETCS level 2	
11193 (420 193-5)	Red	—	—	Upgraded with ETCS level 2	
11194 (420 194-3)	Red	—	—	Upgraded with ETCS level 2	
11195 (420 195-0)	Red	—	—	Upgraded with ETCS level 2	
11196 (420 196-8)	Red	—	—	Upgraded with ETCS level 2	
11197 (420 197-6)	Red	—	—	Upgraded with ETCS level 2	
11198 (420 198-4)	Red	—	—	Upgraded with ETCS level 2	
11199 (420 199-2)	Red	—	—	Upgraded with ETCS level 2	
11200 (420 200-8)	Red	—	—	Upgraded with ETCS level 2	
11201 (420 201)	Dull red	—	—	LION upgrade for Zürich S-Bahn (September 2014)	
11202 (420 202)	Dull red	—	—	LION upgrade for Zürich S-Bahn (July 2011)	
11203 (420 203)	Dull red	—	—	LION upgrade for Zürich S-Bahn (November 2011)	
11204 (420 204)	Dull red	—	—	LION upgrade for Zürich S-Bahn (October 2015)	
11205 (420 205)	Dull red	—	—	LION upgrade for Zürich S-Bahn (September 2012)	
11206 (420 206)	Dull red	—	—	LION upgrade for Zürich S-Bahn (January 2015)	
11207 (420 207)	Dull red	—	—	LION upgrade for Zürich S-Bahn (September 2014)	
11208 (420 208)	Dull red	—	—	LION upgrade for Zürich S-Bahn (January 2014)	
11209 (420 209)	Dull red	—	—	LION upgrade for Zürich S-Bahn (August 2012)	
11210 (420 210)	Dull red	—	—	LION upgrade for Zürich S-Bahn (April 2015)	
11211 (420 211)	Dull red	—	—	LION upgrade for Zürich S-Bahn (September 2013)	
11212 (420 212)	Dull red	—	—	LION upgrade for Zürich S-Bahn (March 2016)	
11213 (420 213)	Dull red	—	—	LION upgrade for Zürich S-Bahn (May 2012)	
11214 (420 214)	Dull red	—	—	LION upgrade for Zürich S-Bahn (July 2015)	
11215 (420 215)	Dull red	—	—	LION upgrade for Zürich S-Bahn (June 2015)	
11216 (420 216)	Dull red	—	—	LION upgrade for Zürich S-Bahn (November 2011)	
11217 (420 217)	Dull red	—	—	LION upgrade for Zürich S-Bahn (July 2014)	
11218 (420 218)	Dull red	—	—	LION upgrade for Zürich S-Bahn (March 2014)	
11219 (420 219)	Dull red	—	—	LION upgrade for Zürich S-Bahn (November 2015)	
11220 (420 220)	Dull red	—	—	LION upgrade for Zürich S-Bahn (May 2014)	
11221 (420 221)	Dull red	—	—	LION upgrade for Zürich S-Bahn (June 2012)	
11222 (420 222)	Dull red	—	—	LION upgrade for Zürich S-Bahn (July 2013)	
11223 (420 223)	Dull red	—	—	LION upgrade for Zürich S-Bahn (November 2013)	
11224 (420 224)	Dull red	—	—	LION upgrade for Zürich S-Bahn (December 2012)	
11225 (420 225)	Dull red	—	—	LION upgrade for Zürich S-Bahn (March 2013)	
11226 (420 226)	Dull red	—	—	LION upgrade for Zürich S-Bahn (April 2013)	
11227 (420 227)	Dull red	—	—	LION upgrade for Zürich S-Bahn (April 2012)	
11228 (420 228)	Dull red	—	—	LION upgrade for Zürich S-Bahn (November 2014)	
11229 (420 229)	Dull red	—	—	LION upgrade for Zürich S-Bahn (January 2013)	
11230 (420 230)	Dull red	—	—	LION upgrade for Zürich S-Bahn (July 2011)	
11231 (420 231-3)	Red	September 2019	September 2019		
11232 (420 232-1)	Red	—	—		
11233 (420 233-9)	Red	June 2023	June 2023		
11234 (420 234-7)	Red	—	—		
11235 (420 235-4)	Red	—	—		
11236 (420 236-2)	Red	January 2022	January 2022		
11237	Red	August 2018	August 2018		
11238 (420 238-8)	Red	—	—		
11239 (420 239-6)	Red	—	—	Named 'Porrentruy'	
11240 (420 240-4)	Red	—	—	Upgraded with ETCS level 2	
11241 (420 241-2)	Red-blue	—	—	Assigned to SBB Cargo	
11242 (420 242-0)	Red	October 2022	October 2022		
11243 (420 243-8)	Red	—	—	Upgraded with ETCS level 2. Special livery Wartung mit Durchblick	
11244 (420 244-6)	Red	—	—	Upgraded with ETCS level 2	
11245 (420 245-3)	Red	—	—	Upgraded with ETCS level 2	
11246 (420 246-1)	Red-blue	—	—	Assigned to SBB Cargo	
11247 (420 247-9)	Red-blue	—	—	Assigned to SBB Cargo. Upgraded with ETCS level 2	
11248 (420 248-7)	Red	—	—	Upgraded with ETCS level 2	
11249 (420 249-5)	Red	—	—	Previously had the Trans Europ Express livery. Upgraded with ETCS level 2	
11250 (420 250-3)	Red	—	—	Upgraded with ETCS level 2. Special livery Wartung mit Durchblick	
11251 (420 251-9)	Red	—	—	Upgraded with ETCS level 2. Special livery 150 Jahre Schweizer Bahnen	
11252 (420 252-9)	Red	—	—	Upgraded with ETCS level 2. Special livery Wartung mit Durchblick	
11253 (420 253-7)	Red-blue	—	—	Previously had the Trans Europ Express livery. Later assigned to SBB Cargo	
11254 (420 254-5)	Red	—	—	Upgraded with ETCS level 2. Special livery Wartung mit Durchblick	
11255 (420 255-2)	Red	—	—	Upgraded with ETCS level 2	
11256 (420 256-0)	Red	—	—	Upgraded with ETCS level 2. Special livery Wartung mit Durchblick	
11257 (420 257-8)	Red	—	—	Upgraded with ETCS level 2. Special livery Nachhaltige Entsorgung	
11258 (420 258-6)	Red	—	—	Upgraded with ETCS level 2	
11259 (420 259-4)	Red	—	—	Upgraded with ETCS level 2	
11260 (420 260-2)	Red	—	—	Upgraded with ETCS level 2	
11261 (420 261-0)	Red	—	—	Upgraded with ETCS level 2	
11262 (420 262-8)	Red-blue	—	—	Assigned to SBB Cargo. Upgraded with ETCS level 2	
11263 (420 263-6)	Red	—	—	Upgraded with ETCS level 2	
11264 (420 264-4)	Red	—	—	Upgraded with ETCS level 2	
11265 (420 265-1)	Red	—	—	Upgraded with ETCS level 2	
11266 (420 266-9)	Red	—	—	Upgraded with ETCS level 2	
11267 (420 267-7)	Red	—	—	Upgraded with ETCS level 2	
11268 (420 268-5)	Red-blue	—	—	Assigned to SBB Cargo. Upgraded with ETCS level 2. Sold to Sersa Group in December 2023	
11269 (420 269-3)	Red	—	—	Upgraded with ETCS level 2	
11270 (420 270-1)	Red-blue	—	—	Assigned to SBB Cargo	
11271 (420 271-9)	Red	—	—	Upgraded with ETCS level 2	
11272 (420 272-7)	Red	November 2022	November 2022	Upgraded with ETCS level 2	
11273 (420 273-5)	Red	—	—	Upgraded with ETCS level 2	
11274	Red	July 2015	July 2015	Accident on rail yard in Muttenz in February 2010	
11275 (420 275-0)	Red-blue	—	—	Assigned to SBB Cargo. Upgraded with ETCS level 2	
11276 (420 276-8)	Red-blue	October 2022	October 2022	Assigned to SBB Cargo. Upgraded with ETCS level 2	
11277 (420 277-6)	Red	—	—	Upgraded with ETCS level 2	
11278 (420 278-4)	Red	—	—	Upgraded with ETCS level 2. Named 'Cham'	
11279 (420 279-2)	Red	—	—	Upgraded with ETCS level 2	
11280 (420 280-0)	Red-blue	—	—	Assigned to SBB Cargo. Upgraded with ETCS level 2. Special livery Vorwärts./Avanti tutta!	
11281 (420 281-8)	Red	—	—	Upgraded with ETCS level 2	
11282	Pine green	October 1975	December 1975	head-on collision with Ae 4/7 10906 near Landquart in October 1975	
11283 (420 283-4)	Red	—	—	Upgraded with ETCS level 2	
11284 (420 284-2)	Red	—	—	Upgraded with ETCS level 2	
11285 (420 285-9)	Red	—	—	Upgraded with ETCS level 2	
11286 (420 286-7)	Red	—	—	Upgraded with ETCS level 2	
11287 (420 287-5)	Red	—	—	Upgraded with ETCS level 2	
11288 (420 288-3)	Red-blue	—	—	Assigned to SBB Cargo. Upgraded with ETCS level 2. Special livery Vorwärts./Avanti tutta!	
11289 (420 289-1)	Red	—	—	Upgraded with ETCS level 2	
11290 (420 290-9)	Red	November 2022	November 2022	Upgraded with ETCS level 2	
11291 (420 291-7)	Red	—	—	Upgraded with ETCS level 2	
11292 (420 292-5)	Red	December 2023	December 2023	Upgraded with ETCS level 2	
11293 (420 293-3)	Red	October 2022	October 2022	Upgraded with ETCS level 2	
11294 (420 294-1)	Red	—	—	Upgraded with ETCS level 2. Special livery 100 Jahre Circus Knie	
11295 (420 295-8)	Red	—	—	Upgraded with ETCS level 2	
11296 (420 296-6)	Red	—	—	Upgraded with ETCS level 2	
11297 (420 297-4)	Red	November 2021	—	Upgraded with ETCS level 2. Accident in November 2021. Sold to railCare in September 2022	
11298 (420 298-2)	Red	November 2022	November 2022	Upgraded with ETCS level 2	
11299 (420 299-0)	Red	—	—		
11300 (420 300-6)	Red	—	—		
11301 (420 301-4)	Red	—	—		
11302 (420 302-2)	Red	—	—		
11303 (420 303-0)	Red	—	—		
11304 (420 304-8)	Red	—	—		
11305 (420 305-5)	Red	October 2022	October 2022		
11306 (420 306-3)	Red	—	—		
11307 (420 307-1)	Red-blue	—	—	Assigned to SBB Cargo	
11308	Red	July 2018	July 2018		
11309	Pine green	August 2018	August 2018		
11310 (420 310-5)	Red-blue	August 2023	August 2023	Assigned to SBB Cargo	
11311	Red	June 2018	June 2018		
11312	Pine green	September 1985	October 1985	collision in Renens on 14 September 1985 with Ae 4/7 10940+11011	
11313 (420 313-9)	Red	January 2022	January 2022		
11314 (420 314-7)	Red-blue	August 2023	August 2023	Assigned to SBB Cargo	
11315	Red	February 2019	February 2019		
11316 (420 316-2)	Red	2023	2023		
11317 (420 317-0)	Red	September 2018	September 2018		
11318 (420 318-8)	Red	—	—		
11319 (420 319-6)	Red	—	—		
11320 (420 320-4)	Orange	November 2022	November 2022	Upgraded with ETCS level 2. Orange livery of InterregioCargo	
11321 (420 321-2)	Red	June 2023	June 2023	Upgraded with ETCS level 2	
11322 (420 322-0)	Pine green (later red)	—	—	Upgraded with ETCS level 2	
11323	Red	March 2005	June 2005	fire damage between Arth-Goldau and Steinen on 23 March 2005	
11324 (420 324-6)	Red	—	—	Upgraded with ETCS level 2	
11325 (420 325-3)	Red	—	—	Upgraded with ETCS level 2	
11326 (420 326-1)	Red	April 2023	April 2023	Upgraded with ETCS level 2	
11327 (420 327-9)	Red	—	—	Upgraded with ETCS level 2	
11328 (420 328-7)	Red	April 2023	April 2023	Upgraded with ETCS level 2	
11329 (420 329-5)	Red	June 2023	June 2023	Upgraded with ETCS level 2	
11330 (420 330-3)	Pine green	June 2023	June 2023	Upgraded with ETCS level 2	
11331 (420 331-1)	Red	—	—	Upgraded with ETCS level 2	
11332 (420 332-9)	Red	—	—	Upgraded with ETCS level 2	
11333	Red	October 2016	October 2016	Accident in Erstfeld in May 2015	
11334 (420 334-5)	Red	—	—	Upgraded with ETCS level 2	
11335 (420 335-2)	Pine green	—	—	Upgraded with ETCS level 2	
11336 (420 336-6)	Red	—	—	Upgraded with ETCS level 2	
11337 (420 337-8)	Red-blue	—	—	Assigned to SBB Cargo. Upgraded with ETCS level 2	
11338 (420 338-6)	Red	—	—	Upgraded with ETCS level 2	
11339 (420 339-4)	Red	—	—	Upgraded with ETCS level 2	
11340 (420 340-2)	Red	—	—	Upgraded with ETCS level 2	
11341 (420 341-0)	Red	—	—	Upgraded with ETCS level 2	
11342 (420 342-8)	Red	—	—	Upgraded with ETCS level 2	
11343 (420 343-6)	Red	October 2023	October 2023	Upgraded with ETCS level 2	
11344 (420 344-4)	Red-blue	—	—	Assigned to SBB Cargo. Upgraded with ETCS level 2	
11345 (420 345-1)	Red	—	—	Upgraded with ETCS level 2. Special livery Wartung mit Durchblick	
11346 (420 346-9)	Red-blue	—	—	Assigned to SBB Cargo. Upgraded with ETCS level 2	
11347 (420 347-7)	Red-blue	—	—	Assigned to SBB Cargo. Upgraded with ETCS level 2	
11348 (420 348-5)	Red	—	—	Upgraded with ETCS level 2	
11349 (420 349-3)	Pine green	—	—	Upgraded with ETCS level 2	
11371 (421 371-6)	Red-blue	—	—	Assigned to SBB Cargo. Upgraded to Re 421 for cross-border operations to Germany in December 2002. Later with special livery 6 x Zürich - München ab 2021. Sold to UTL in August 2022	
11372 (421 372-4)	Red-blue	March 2021	March 2021	Assigned to SBB Cargo. Upgraded to Re 421 for cross-border operations to Germany in March 2003	
11373 (421 373-2)	Red-blue	—	—	Assigned to SBB Cargo. Upgraded to Re 421 for cross-border operations to Germany in February 2003. Sold to Widmer Rail Service AG (WRS) in January 2018	
11374 (421 374-0)	Red-blue	—	—	Assigned to SBB Cargo. Upgraded to Re 421 for cross-border operations to Germany in March 2003. Sold to Swiss Rail Traffic in September 2020	
11375 (421 375-7)	Red-blue	December 2020	December 2020	Assigned to SBB Cargo. Upgraded to Re 421 for cross-border operations to Germany in March 2003	
11376 (421 376-5)	Red-blue	December 2020	December 2020	Assigned to SBB Cargo. Upgraded to Re 421 for cross-border operations to Germany in October 2003	
11377 (421 377-3)	Red-blue	June 2021	June 2021	Assigned to SBB Cargo. Upgraded to Re 421 for cross-border operations to Germany in October 2002	
11378 (421 378-1)	Red-blue	June 2021	June 2021	Assigned to SBB Cargo. Upgraded to Re 421 for cross-border operations to Germany in March 2003	
11379 (421 379-9)	Red-blue	—	—	Assigned to SBB Cargo. Upgraded to Re 421 for cross-border operations to Germany in January 2003. Later with special livery 6 x Zürich - München ab 2021. Sold to Dampflok-Depot Full in May 2021	
11380 (421 380-7)	Red-blue	July 2021	July 2021	Assigned to SBB Cargo. Upgraded to Re 421 for cross-border operations to Germany in April 2003	
11381 (421 381-5)	Red-blue	—	—	Assigned to SBB Cargo. Upgraded to Re 421 for cross-border operations to Germany in April 2003. Sold to Widmer Rail Service AG (WRS) in January 2018	
11382	Red	—	02 July 2002	fire damage on 31 January 2002	
11383 (421 383-1)	Red-blue	—	—	Assigned to SBB Cargo. Upgraded to Re 421 for cross-border operations to Germany in April 2003. Later with special livery 6 x Zürich - München ab 2021. Sold to UTL in August 2022	
11384 (421 380-7)	Red-blue	February 2021	February 2021	Assigned to SBB Cargo. Upgraded to Re 421 for cross-border operations to Germany in October 2003	
11385 (421 385-6)	Red-blue	July 2021	July 2021	Assigned to SBB Cargo. Upgraded to Re 421 for cross-border operations to Germany in March 2004	
11386 (421 386-4)	Red-blue	December 2020	December 2020	Assigned to SBB Cargo. Upgraded to Re 421 for cross-border operations to Germany in April 2004	
11387 (421 387-2)	Red-blue	—	—	Assigned to SBB Cargo. Upgraded to Re 421 for cross-border operations to Germany in December 2004. Sold to IRSI in September 2019	
11388 (421 388-0)	Red-blue	August 2023	August 2023	Assigned to SBB Cargo. Upgraded to Re 421 for cross-border operations to Germany in April 2004	
11389 (421 389-8)	Red-blue	February 2023	February 2023	Assigned to SBB Cargo. Upgraded to Re 421 for cross-border operations to Germany in March 2004	
11390 (421 390-6)	Red-blue	July 2021	July 2021	Assigned to SBB Cargo. Upgraded to Re 421 for cross-border operations to Germany in June 2004	
11391 (421 391-4)	Red-blue	December 2020	December 2020	Assigned to SBB Cargo. Upgraded to Re 421 for cross-border operations to Germany in October 2004	
11392 (421 392-2)	Red-blue	March 2021	March 2021	Assigned to SBB Cargo. Upgraded to Re 421 for cross-border operations to Germany in August 2004. Later with special livery 6 x Zürich - München ab 2021	
11393 (421 393-0)	Red-blue	—	—	Assigned to SBB Cargo. Upgraded to Re 421 for cross-border operations to Germany in May 2004. Sold to IRSI in September 2019	
11394 (421 394-8)	Red-blue	June 2021	June 2021	Assigned to SBB Cargo. Upgraded to Re 421 for cross-border operations to Germany in April 2004. Later with special livery 6 x Zürich - München ab 2021	
11395 (421 395-5)	Red-blue	December 2017	December 2017	Assigned to SBB Cargo. Upgraded to Re 421 for cross-border operations to Germany in May 2004. Accident in Winterthur in February 2017	
11396 (421 396-3)	Red-blue	July 2018	July 2018	Assigned to SBB Cargo. Upgraded to Re 421 for cross-border operations to Germany in June 2004	
11397 (421 397-1)	Red-blue	February 2019	February 2019	Assigned to SBB Cargo. Upgraded to Re 421 for cross-border operations to Germany in January 2003	

=== Re 4/4^{III} (Re 430, Re 436) ===
A total of 21 Re 4/4^{III} were operated by SBB CFF FFS, numbered 11350–11370. They were later referred to as Re 430 and their numbering was shortened. An additional five engines were bought by the predecessors of Regionalverkehr Mittelland (RM), Re 4/4^{III} 111–113, 141 and 181. These were later sold to Crossrail AG (renamed Re 436) and Widmer Rail Service AG (renamed Re 430), respectively. The following is a list of Re 4/4^{III} engines.

List of Re 4/4^{III} locomotives
Engine №	Colour	Withdrawn	Scrapped	Notes	Image
11350 (430 350-9)	Red	December 2021	—	Bought from SOB (Re 4/4 41) in October 1995, sold to DSF Koblenz in December 2021	
11351 (430 351-7)	Red	March 2021	March 2021	Sold to SOB in January 1985, renamed Re 4/4 44. Rebought from SOB in December 1994	
11352 (430 352-5)	Red	June 2021	June 2021	Sold to SOB in July 1983, renamed Re 4/4 42. Rebought from SOB in April 1995	
11353 (430 353-3)	Red	October 2022	October 2022	Sold to SOB in January 1984, renamed Re 4/4 43. Rebought from SOB in December 1994	
11354 (430 354-1)	Red	August 2021	August 2021		
11355 (430 355-8)	Red	February 2020	February 2020		
11356 (430 356-6)	Red-blue	April 2023	April 2023	Assigned to SBB Cargo	
11357 (430 357-4)	Red	June 2021	June 2021		
11358 (430 358-2)	Red	June 2021	June 2021		
11359 (430 359-0)	Red	October 2022	October 2022		
11360 (430 360-8)	Red	—	June 2019	Accident in Langenthal in December 2018	
11361 (430 361-6)	Red	November 2021	November 2021		
11362 (430 362-4)	Red	December 2020	December 2020		
11363 (430 363-2)	Red	December 2020	December 2020		
11364 (430 364-0)	Pine green	July 2021	July 2021		
11365	Red	October 2013	June 2014		
11366 (430 366-5)	Red	January 2022	January 2022		
11367 (430 367-3)	Red	August 2021	August 2021		
11368 (430 368-1)	Red	June 2021	June 2021		
11369 (430 369-9)	Red	December 2020	December 2020		
11370 (430 370-7)	Red	April 2023	April 2023		
111	—	—	—	Originally belonged to EBT, later RM. Sold to Crossrail AG and renamed Re 436 111-9. Currently in operation for Widmer Rail Service AG (WRS) as Re 430 111-5	
112	—	—	—	Originally belonged to EBT, later RM. Sold to Crossrail AG and renamed Re 436 112-7. Currently in operation for WRS as Re 430 112-3	
113	—	January 2010	September 2017	Originally belonged to EBT, later RM. Sold to Crossrail AG and renamed Re 436 113-5. Accident in Brig on 28 January 2010	
141	—	—	—	Originally belonged to VHB, later RM. Sold to Crossrail AG and renamed Re 436 114-3. Currently in operation for WRS as Re 430 114-9	
181	—	—	—	Originally belonged to SMB, later RM. Sold to Crossrail AG and renamed Re 436 115-0. Currently in operation for WRS as Re 430 115-6	

=== Named locomotives ===
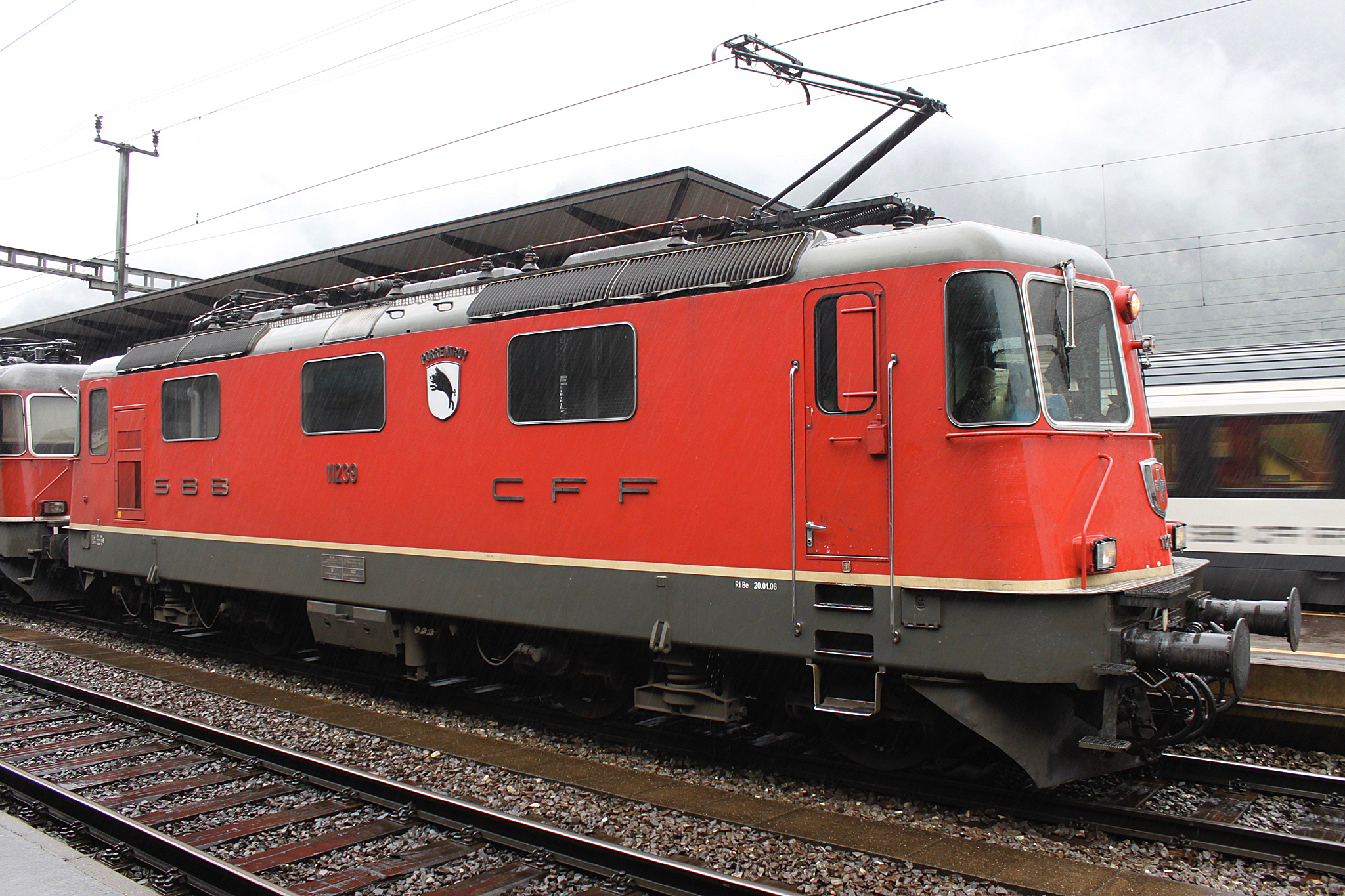
Re 4/4^{II} 11239, named Porrentruy and carrying the town's coat of arms

Exceptionally, two Re 420 locomotives are named after communes, as indicated also by their respective coat of arms on the side of the engine. A third one is named 'Depot G', indicated below the driver's window:

- Re 4/4^{II} 11239 (Re 420 239-6) «Porrentruy»
- Re 4/4^{II} 11278 (Re 420 278-4) «Cham»
- Re 4/4^{II} 11191 (Re 420 191-9) «Depot G»

Locomotive Re 4/4^{II} 11239 inherited the name and coat of arms of Porrentruy from Ae 6/6 11483, which after the foundation of the canton of Jura in 1979 was renamed after that canton. Locomotive Re 4/4^{II} 11278 received the name and coat of arms of Cham from Re 6/6 11673, which was involved in an accident in May 2015 in Erstfeld and was subsequently used for spare parts. Other Re 420 are not named, although in Switzerland it is common practice to name both locomotives (e.g. SBB Ae 6/6, Re 450, Re 460, Re 620) and EMUs (e.g. SBB RABDe 500 and RABe 501).

== Accidents ==
- On 24 October 2003, two passenger trains collided near Zurich Oerlikon station.
- On 10 January 2013, a Re 420 LION-hauled trainset of the former S11 peak-hour service of Zurich S-Bahn collided with a Thurbo regional train (S33) near Neuhausen railway station.
- On 19 May 2025, a collision between a locomotive (without carriage) and a rail excavator occurred in the Heiligkreuz area of St. Gallen.

== Gallery ==
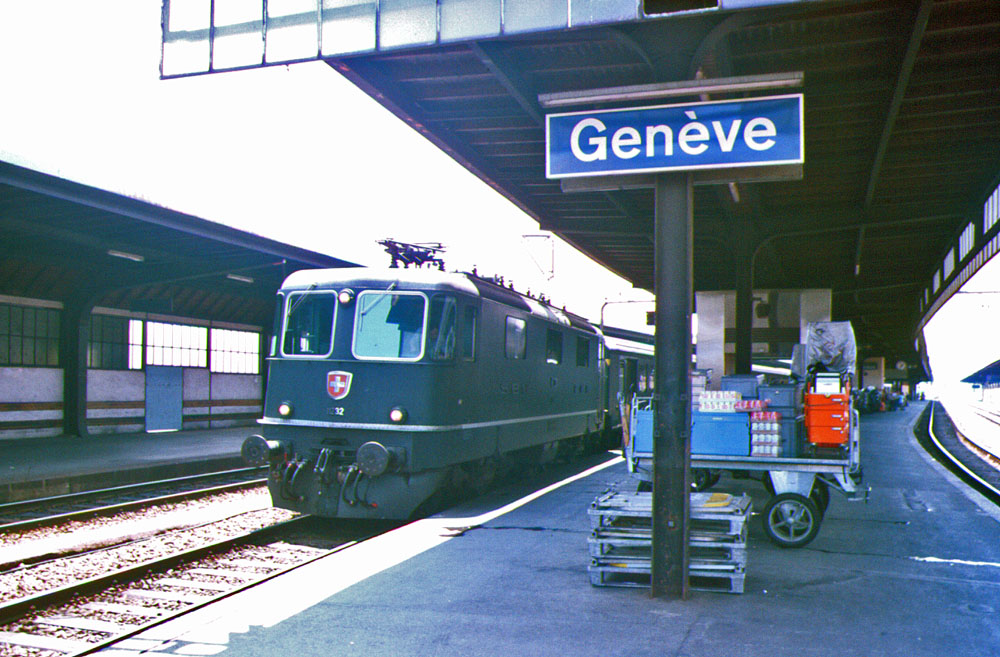
Pine green Re 4/4^{II} before modernization in Geneva in 1985, with round headlights

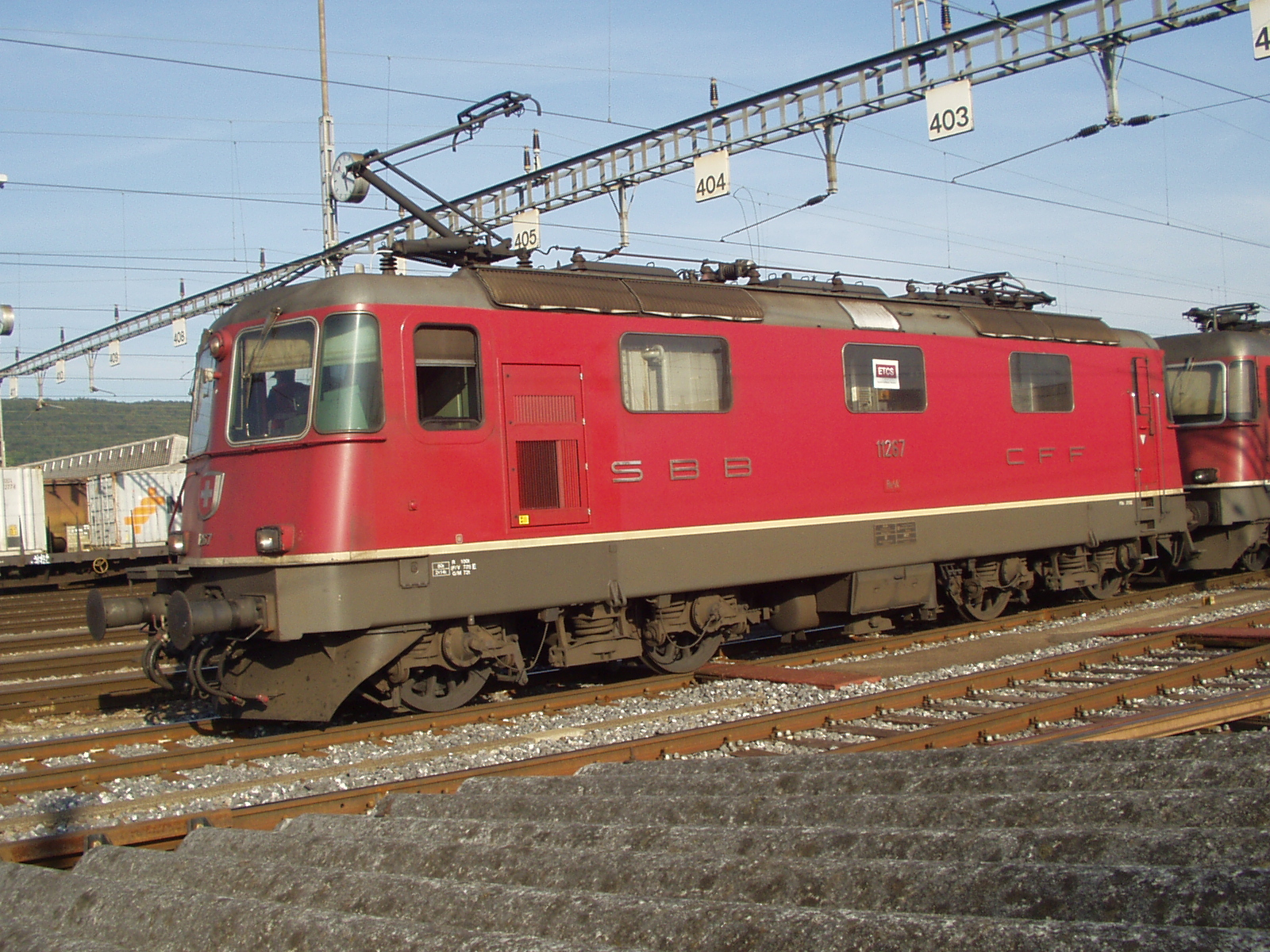
Fully modernized 11267: red color scheme, air conditioning, rectangular headlights, UIC plug, and steps

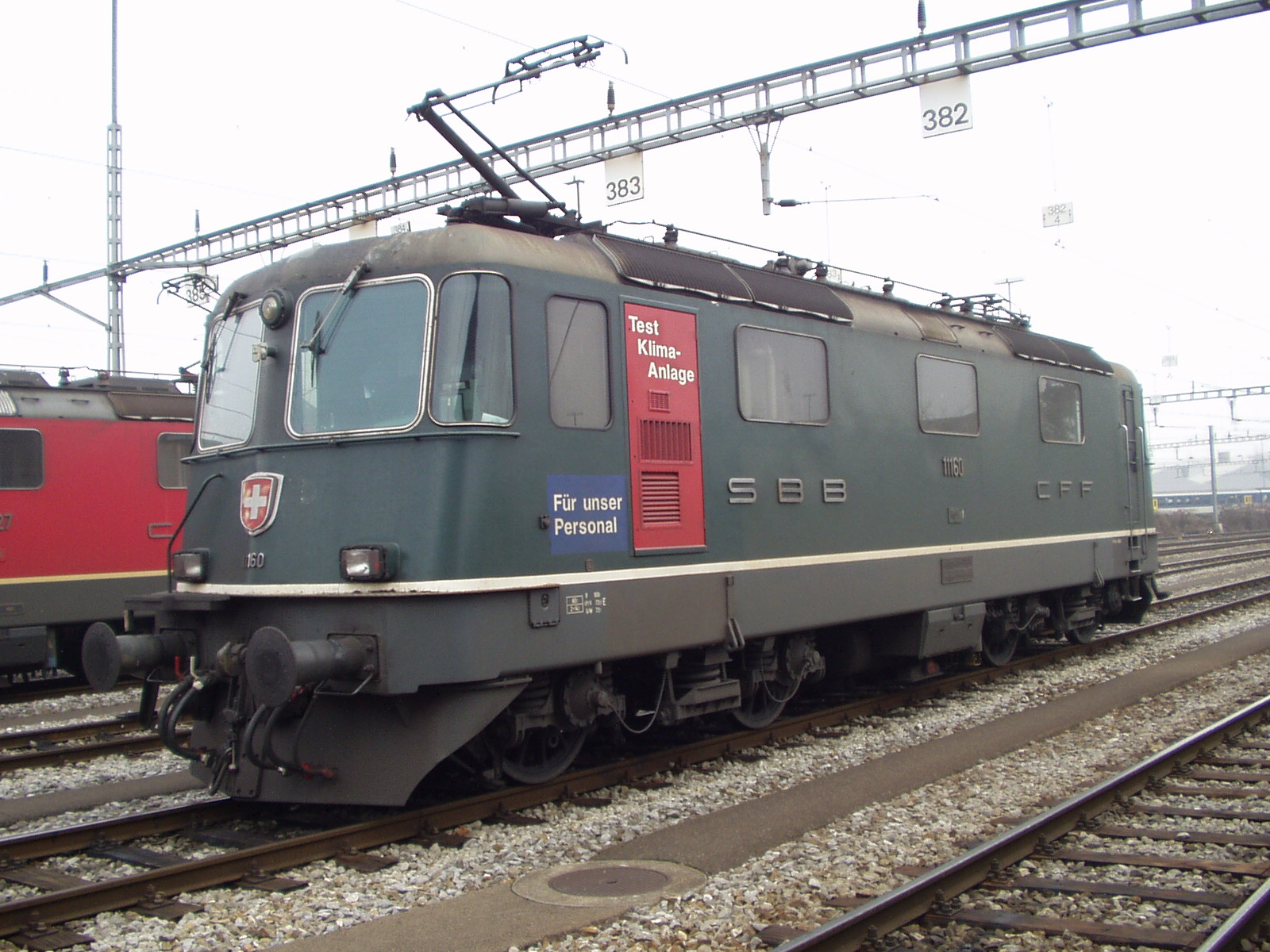
Unit 11160 was the first locomotive to be equipped with air conditioning

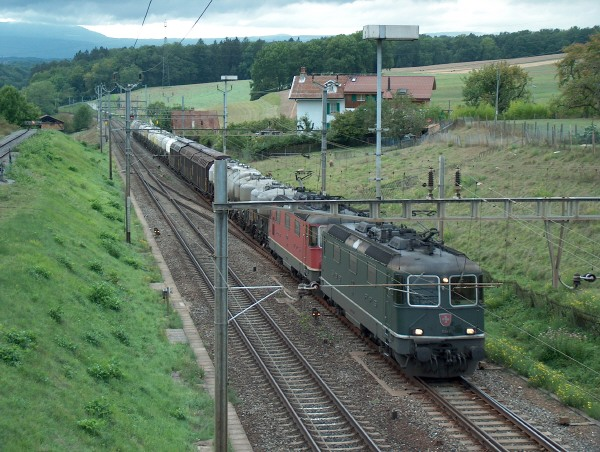
A freight train pulled by two Re 420 units

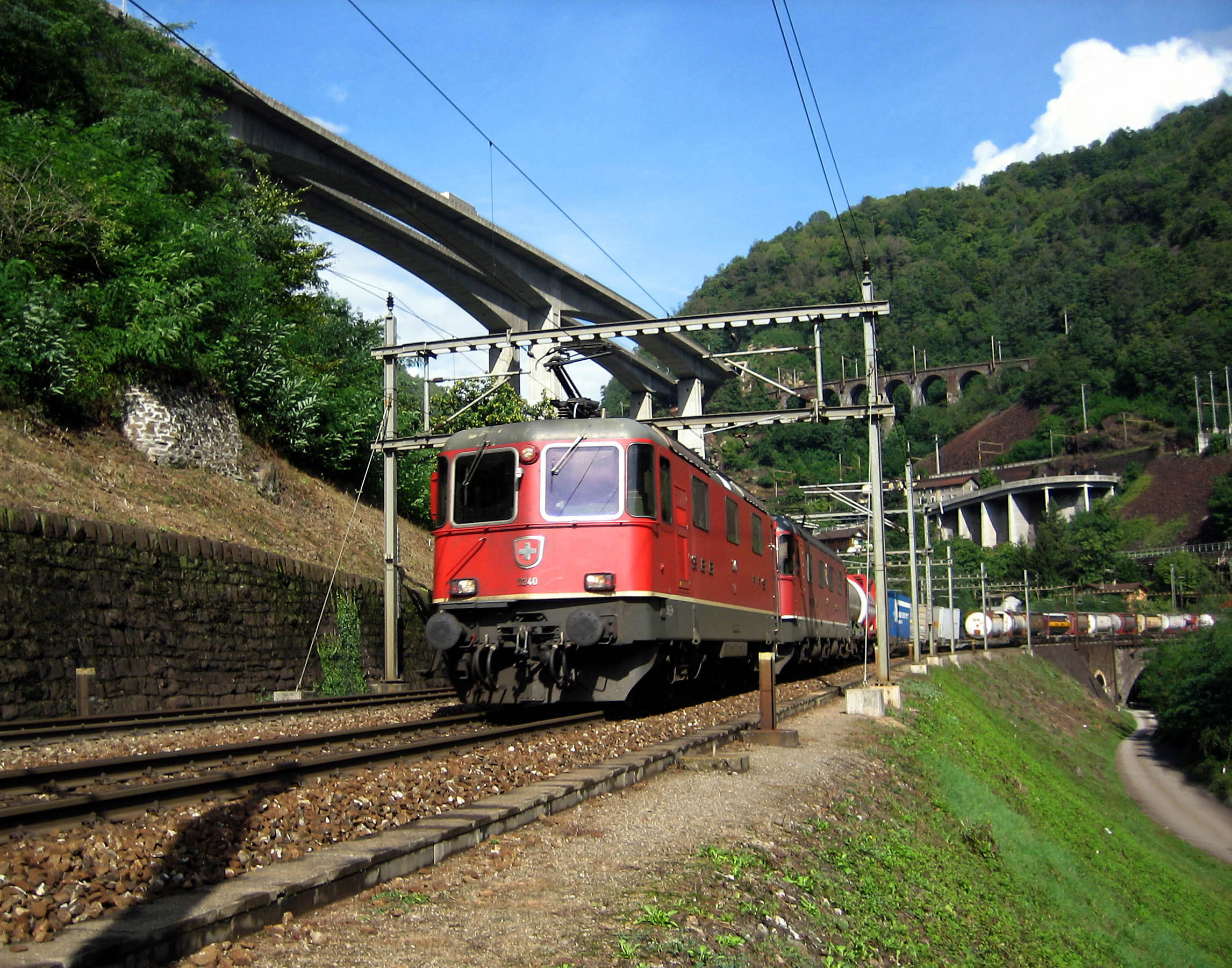
Re 420 and Re 620 pull a freight train on the Gotthard route

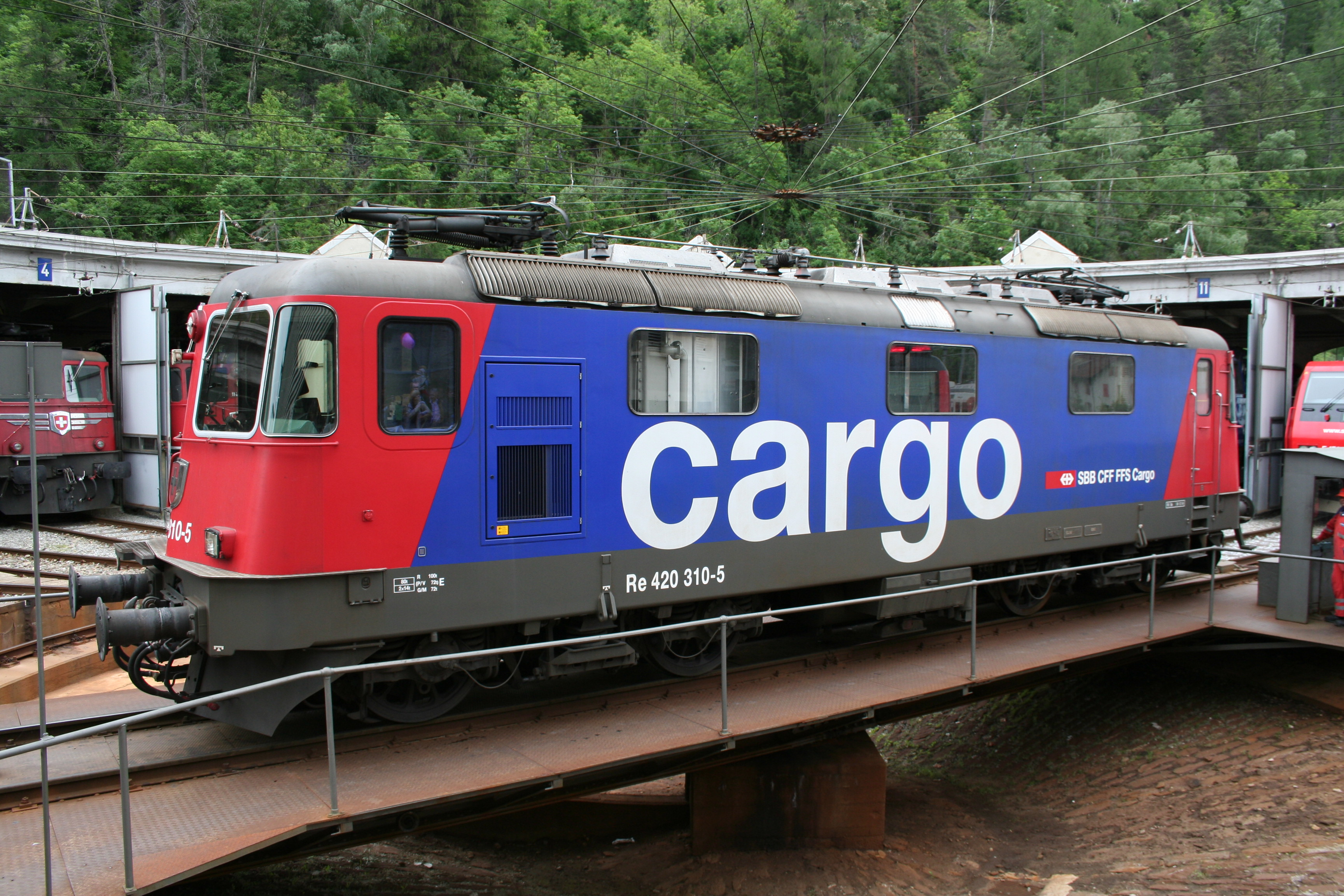
Re 420 310-5 with SBB Cargo livery

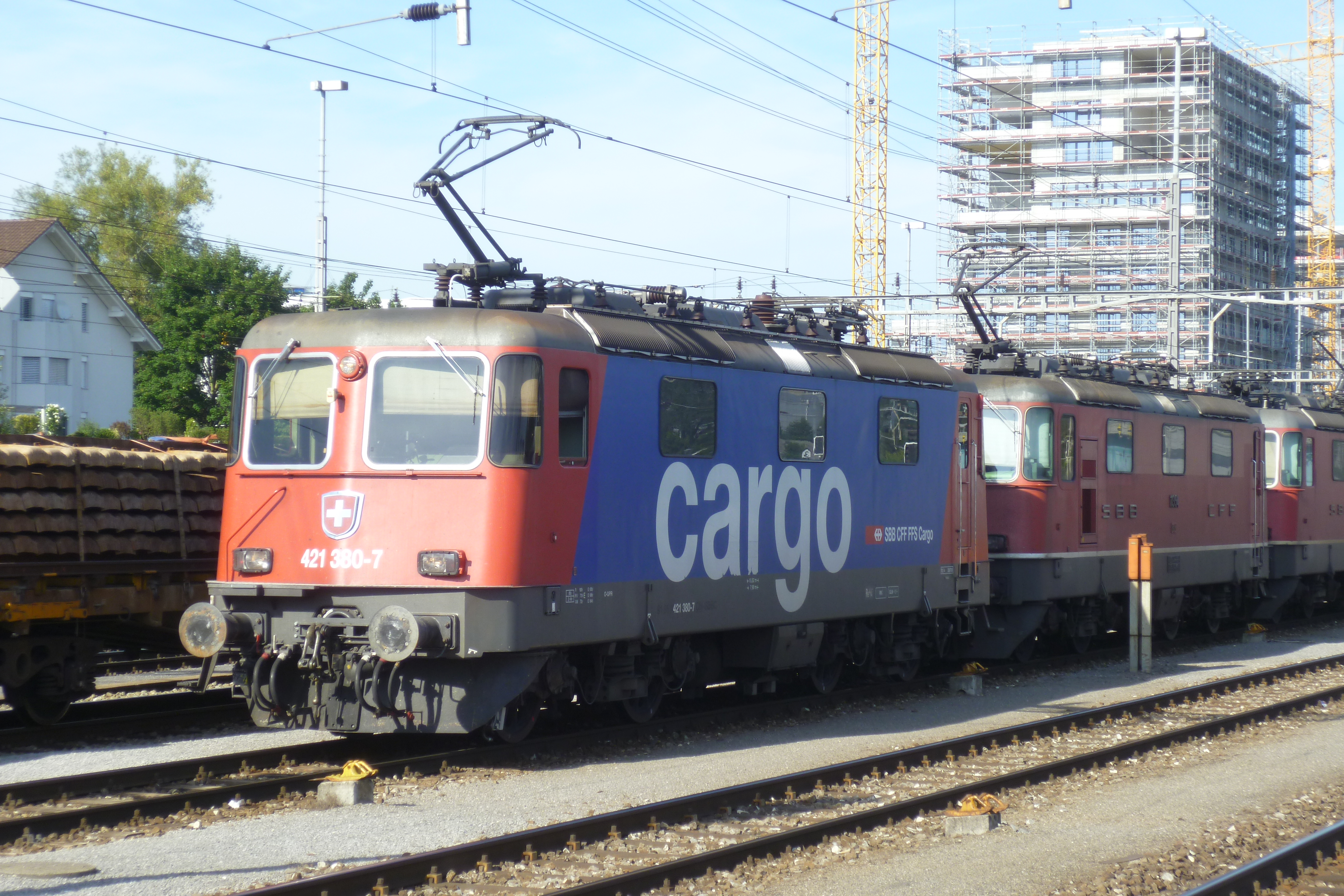
Re 421 380-7: this subtype is adapted for service in Germany

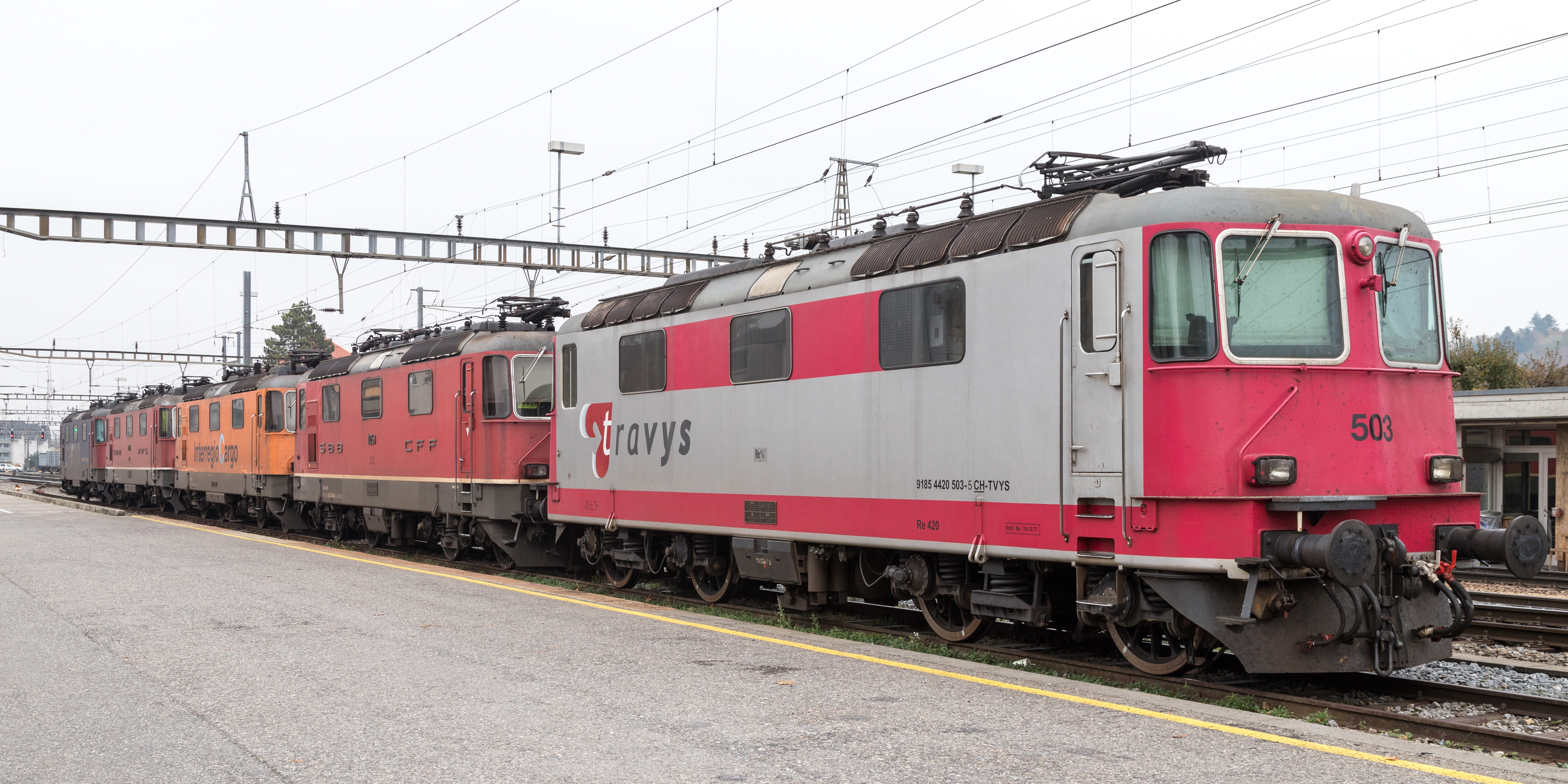
Re 420s of travys, SBB and Interregio Cargo in Aarberg

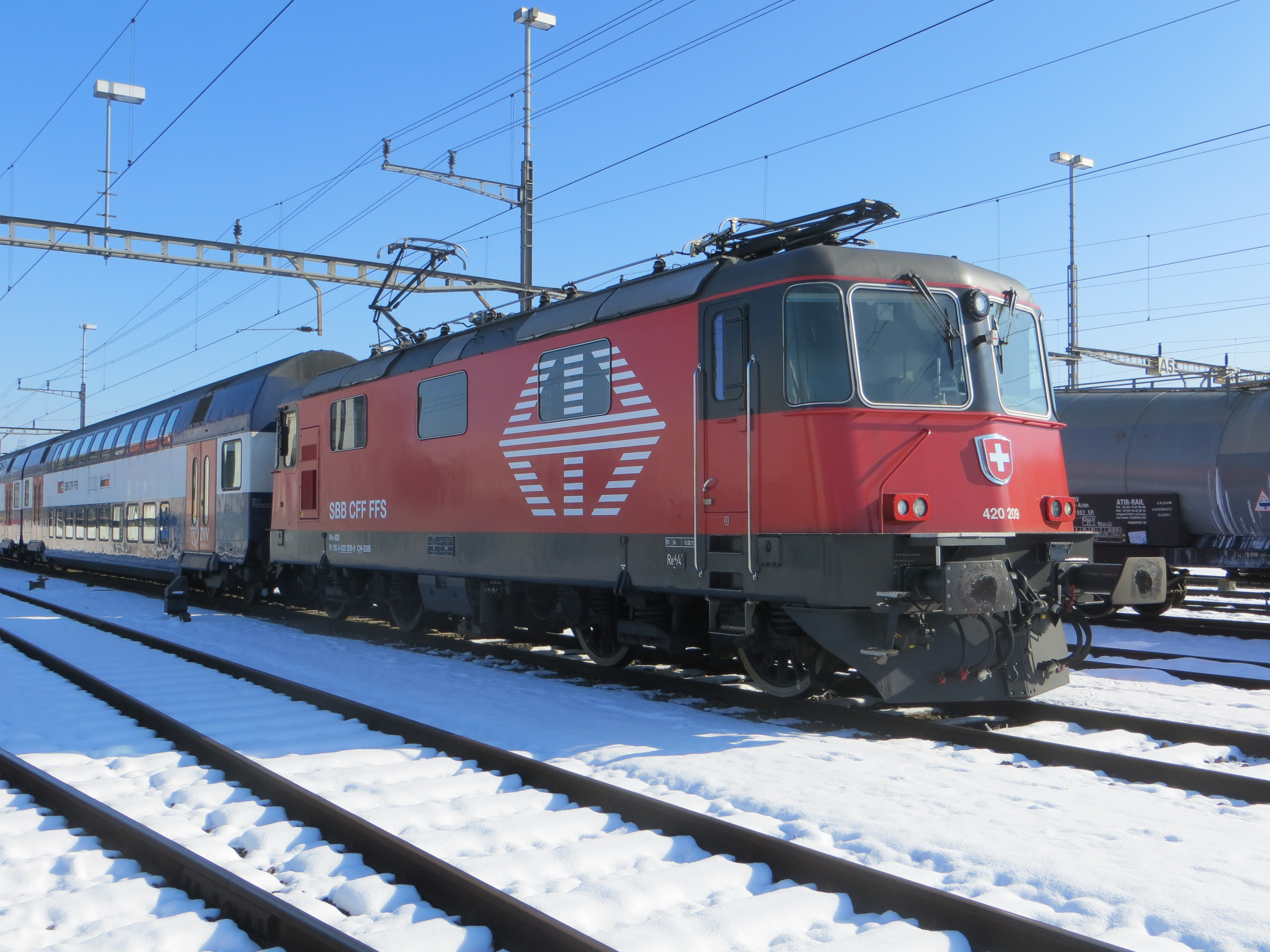
SBB Re 420 209-9 LION of Zurich S-Bahn

== See also ==
- List of stock used by Swiss Federal Railways
- Swiss locomotive and railcar classification
