= SBB Re 620 =

Swiss electric locomotive

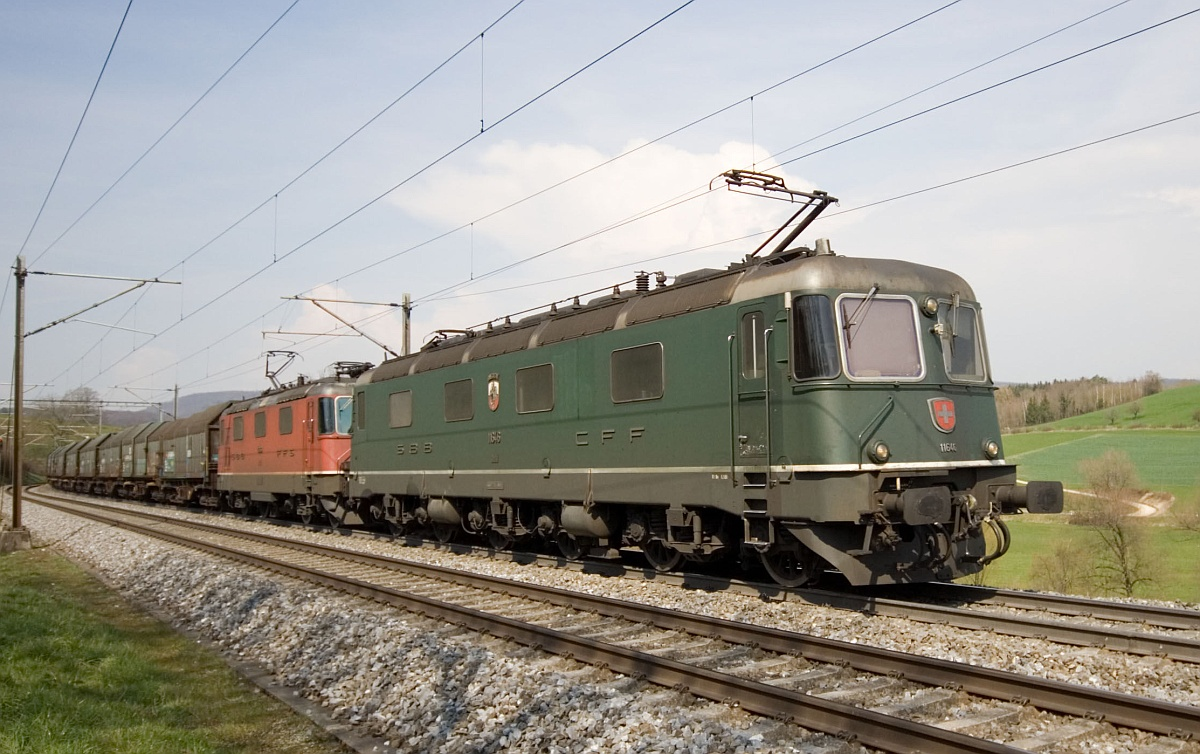
- Re 620 and SBB Re 420 leading a freight train on the northern Bözberg incline
Type and origin
- Power type: Electric
- Builder: SLM Winterthur; BBC Baden; SAAS Geneva
- Build date: 1972, 1975–1980
- Total produced: 89
Specifications
- Configuration
  - UIC: Bo'Bo'Bo'
- Gauge: 1,435 mm (4 ft 8 1/2 in) standard gauge
- Length: 19,310 mm (63 ft 4 1/4 in)
- Width: 2,950 mm (9 ft 8 1/8 in)
- Height: 3,932 mm (12 ft 10 3/4 in)
- Loco weight: 120 t (118.1 long tons; 132.3 short tons)
- Electric system/s: 15 kV 16.7 Hz AC Catenary
- Current pickup: Pantograph
Performance figures
- Maximum speed: 140 km/h (87 mph)
- Power output: 10,700 hp (8,000 kW)
- Tractive effort
  - Starting: 395 kN (89,000 lb_{f})
  - 1 hour: 270 kN (61,000 lb_{f})
  - Continuous: 235 kN (53,000 lb_{f})
Career
- Numbers: 11601 – 11689

The Re 620, Re 6/6 in the old numbering scheme, are six-axle, electric locomotives of Swiss Federal Railways (SBB CFF FFS), which were acquired as a replacement for the Ae 6/6 for heavy services on the Gotthard Railway. They were produced between 1972 and 1980 and are the most modern of the so-called "Gotthard locomotives".

== Construction and Technology ==
To reach the necessary tractive effort, a construction comprising six driven axles was necessary. In order to still get good running characteristics in curves, they were built into three two-axle bogies instead of two three-axle bogies as on the Ae 6/6. The middle bogie can move sideways, and the three bogies are connected by elastic cross couplings. Two of the four prototypes (11601, 11602) were built with a split locomotive body, whereby the joint may only move on an horizontal transverse axis to allow for changes in gradient, similar to the Rhaetian Railway Ge 6/6 ^{II}.

The other two prototypes (11603, 11604) got a softer secondary suspension instead of the joint, which proved to be so reliable in everyday use that all other locomotives of the series were built this way. Nevertheless, the two prototypes with a split body are still in regular operation. The exterior design is similar to the Re 4/4^{II} (Re 420), as are the driver's controls and the conventional transformer technology with fixed running notches, which was applied for the last time for this locomotive. In contrast to the Re 4/4^{II}, the Re 6/6 has two transformers (one power and one control transformer), which are mounted on the frame between the bogies. Due to the higher roof, the Re 6/6 looks more brawny than the Re 4/4^{II}, especially when seen from the front side.

== Operations ==
The Re 6/6 is equipped with multiple unit train control together with Re 4/4^{II}, Re 4/4^{III} (Re 430), Re 4/4^{IV} and RBe 540. In passenger traffic they pull heavy passenger trains over the Gotthard route (as an alternative to a double heading of Re 4/4). In freight traffic they are used all over Switzerland for heavy trains, on the Gotthard route very often together with an Re 4/4^{II} or Re 4/4^{III}. Such a couple, often referred to as "Re 10/10" (both locomotives are Re class, so the couple is Re class; 10/10 means that they overall have 10 driven axles out of 10), is capable of pulling the maximum train weight of 1,300 tonnes (1,300 long tons; 1,400 short tons) on 2.6% gradients of the Gotthard line. For heavier trains, up to 1600 tons are operationally feasible, an additional bank engine has to help push the train in order to not overload the couplers.

Locomotive 11638 was retired and scrapped in 1990 due to an accident. For the renumbering to the UIC-conforming new numbering scheme in 1992, only the still existing locomotives were considered, thus the 11638 did not get a new number. But the renumbering was never done consistently. During 2005, the UIC numbering scheme was reworked, and 620 001 (instead of 000) was defined to be the smallest number. To make things easy, the scrapped 11638 also got a new number, 620 038. About half a dozen locomotives bore the new numbers at the beginning of 2006.

After two locomotives were tentatively equipped with radio remote control for pushing trains on the Gotthard line (such that the locomotive pushing at the end of the train may be controlled by the engineer at the front), about 30 locomotives were equipped with it in 2000. To make them administratively distinguishable, they got the new designation Ref 6/6.

When SBB was divided into passenger services and freight, the first thirteen locomotives (11601–11613) remained in the passenger division. On 1 January 2003 they were exchanged against the Re 460, meaning that now all remaining 88 locomotives were assigned to SBB Cargo. Due to the reassignment of the Re 460 to the passenger division, the Re 6/6 again dominated freight traffic on the Gotthard line.

The locomotives are assigned to the workshops in Erstfeld, Bellinzona and Lausanne (Lausanne: 2000, today unknown). Revisions are done at the main workshop at Bellinzona.

== Naming and numbering ==
Since the Kantonsloks (lit. 'canton locomotives') Ae 6/6, naming of locomotives and EMUs (e.g., SBB RABDe 500, RABe 501) is common practice in Switzerland. Re 620 locomotives are numbered 11601–11689 and named after Swiss communes (except Bad Säckingen). In addition to the communes' names, also their coat of arms is indicated on the side of each engine.

The following table lists Re 620 locomotives with their number, commune names and respective coat of arms (COA). Crossed out numbers indicate scrapped locomotives.

№	COA	Name	№	COA	Name	№	COA	Name
11601		Wolhusen	11631		Dulliken	11661		Gampel-Steg
11602		Morges	11632		Däniken	11662		Reuchenette-Péry
11603		Wädenswil	11633		Muri AG	11663		Eglisau
11604		Faido	11634		Aarburg-Oftringen	11664		Köniz
11605		Uster	11635		Muttenz	11665		Ziegelbrücke
11606		Turgi	11636		Vernier-Meyrin	11666		Stein am Rhein
11607		Wattwil	11637		Sonceboz-Sombeval	11667		Bodio
11608		Wetzikon	~~11638~~		St-Triphon	11668		Stein-Säckingen
11609		Uzwil	11639		Murten	11669		Hägendorf
11610		Spreitenbach	11640		Münchenstein	11670		Affoltern am Albis
11611		Rüti ZH	11641		Moutier	11671		Othmarsingen
11612		Regensdorf	11642		Monthey	11672		Balerna
11613		Rapperswil	11643		Laufen	~~11673~~		Cham (Note: Coat of arms transferred to Re 4/4^{II} 11278 after accident)
11614		Meilen	11644		Cornaux	11674		Murgenthal
11615		Kloten	11645		Colombier	11675		Gelterkinden
11616		Illnau-Effretikon	11646		Bussigny	11676		Zurzach
11617		Heerbrugg	11647		Bex	11677		Neuhausen am Rheinfall
11618		Dübendorf	11648		Aigle	11678		Bassersdorf
11619		Arbon	11649		Aarberg	11679		Cadenazzo
~~11620~~		Wangen bei Olten	11650		Schönenwerd	11680		Möhlin
11621		Taverne-Torricella	11651		Dornach-Arlesheim	11681		Immensee
11622		Suhr	11652		Kerzers	11682		Pfäffikon SZ
11623		Rupperswil	11653		Gümligen	11683		Amsteg-Silenen
11624		Rothrist	~~11654~~		Villeneuve	11684		Uznach
11625		Oensingen	11655		Cossonay	11685		Sulgen
11626		Zollikofen	11656		Travers	11686		Hochdorf
11627		Luterbach-Attisholz	11657		Estavayer-le-Lac	11687		Bischofszell
11628		Konolfingen	11658		Auvernier	11688		Linthal
11629		Interlaken	11659		Chavornay	11689		Gerra-Gambarogno
11630		Herzogenbuchsee	11660		Tavannes			

== Gallery ==
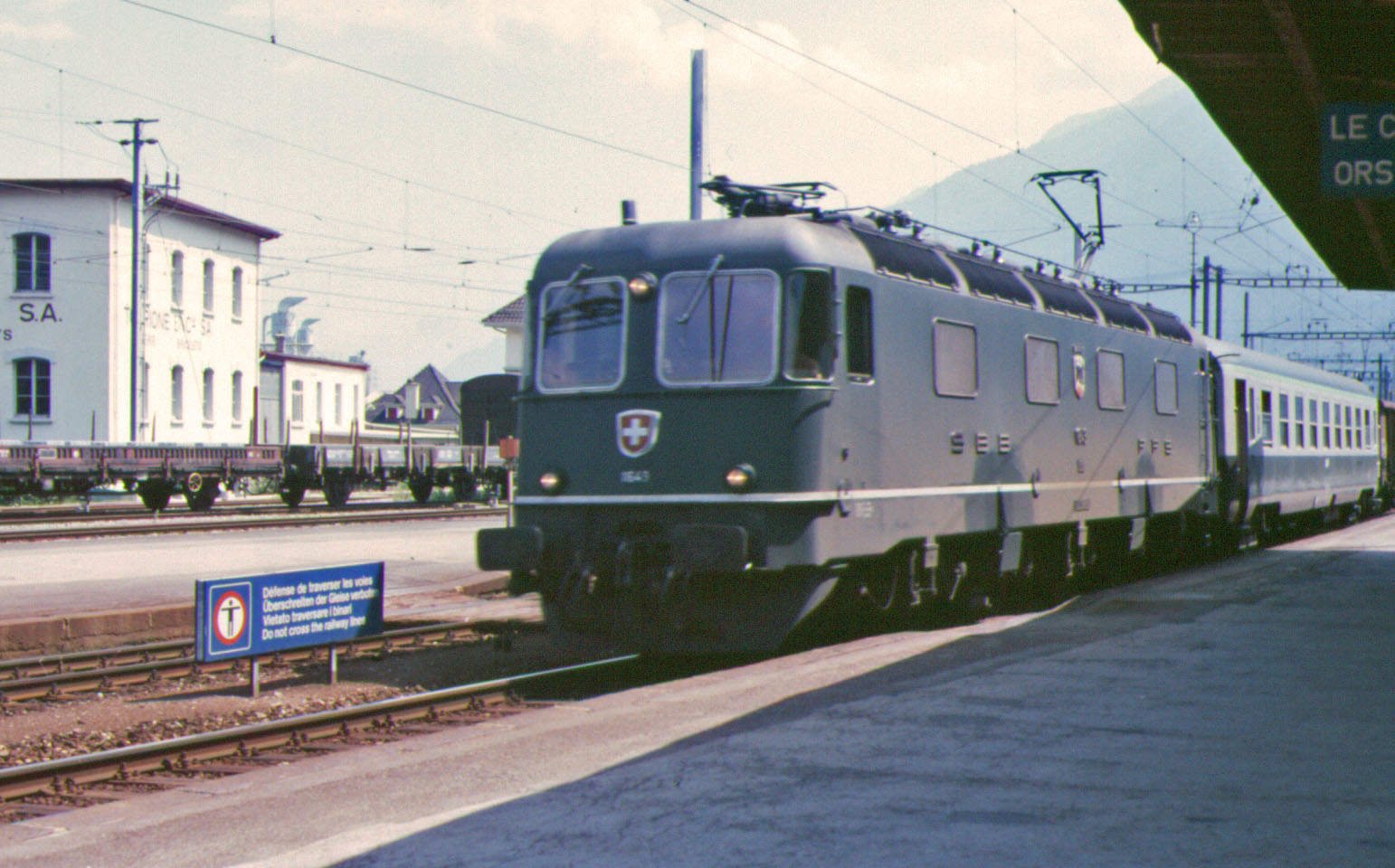
Re 6/6 11641 in its original condition leading a passenger train in the Rhône valley at Martigny.

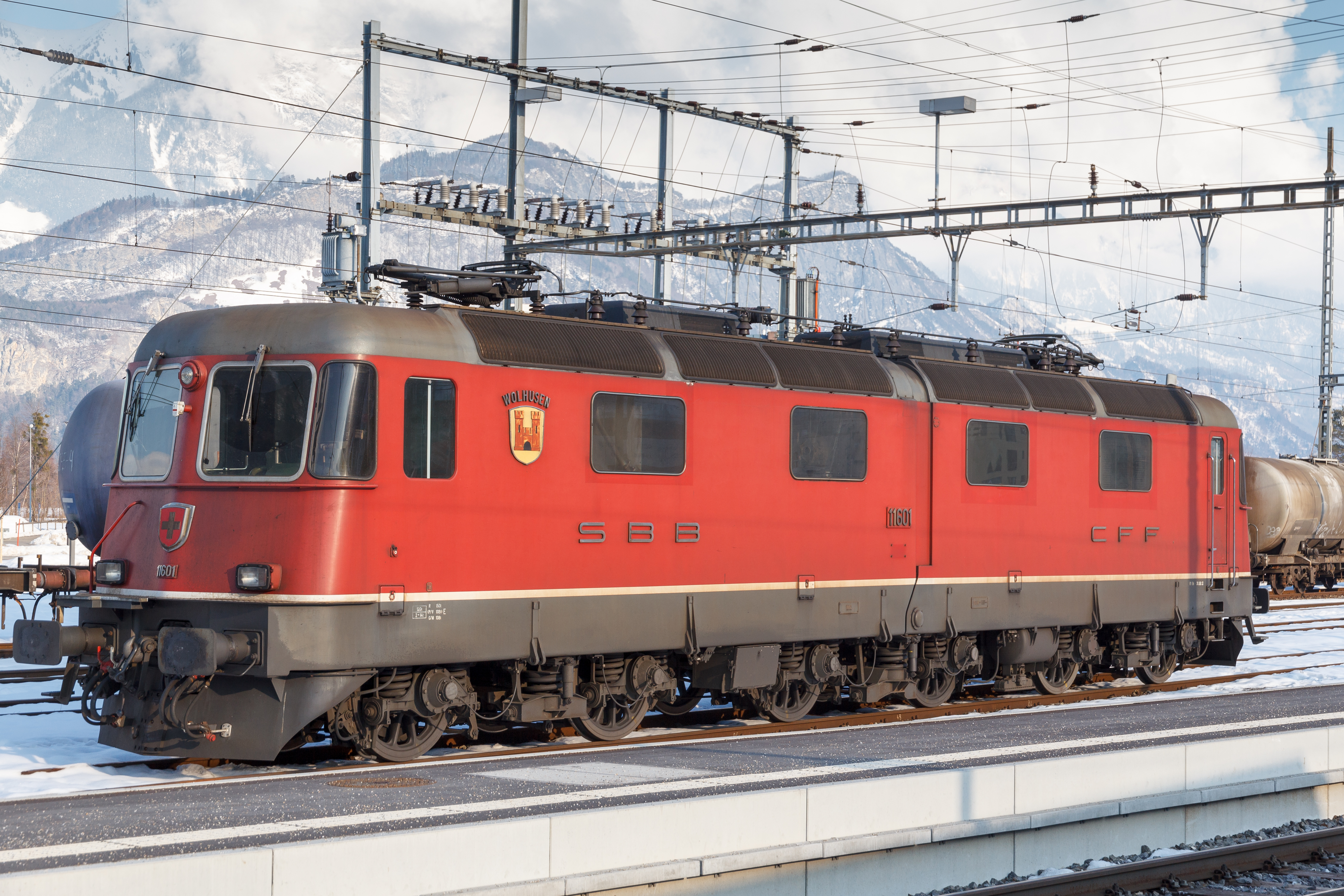
SBB Re 6/6 Nr. 10601 Wolhusen (prototype with split body)

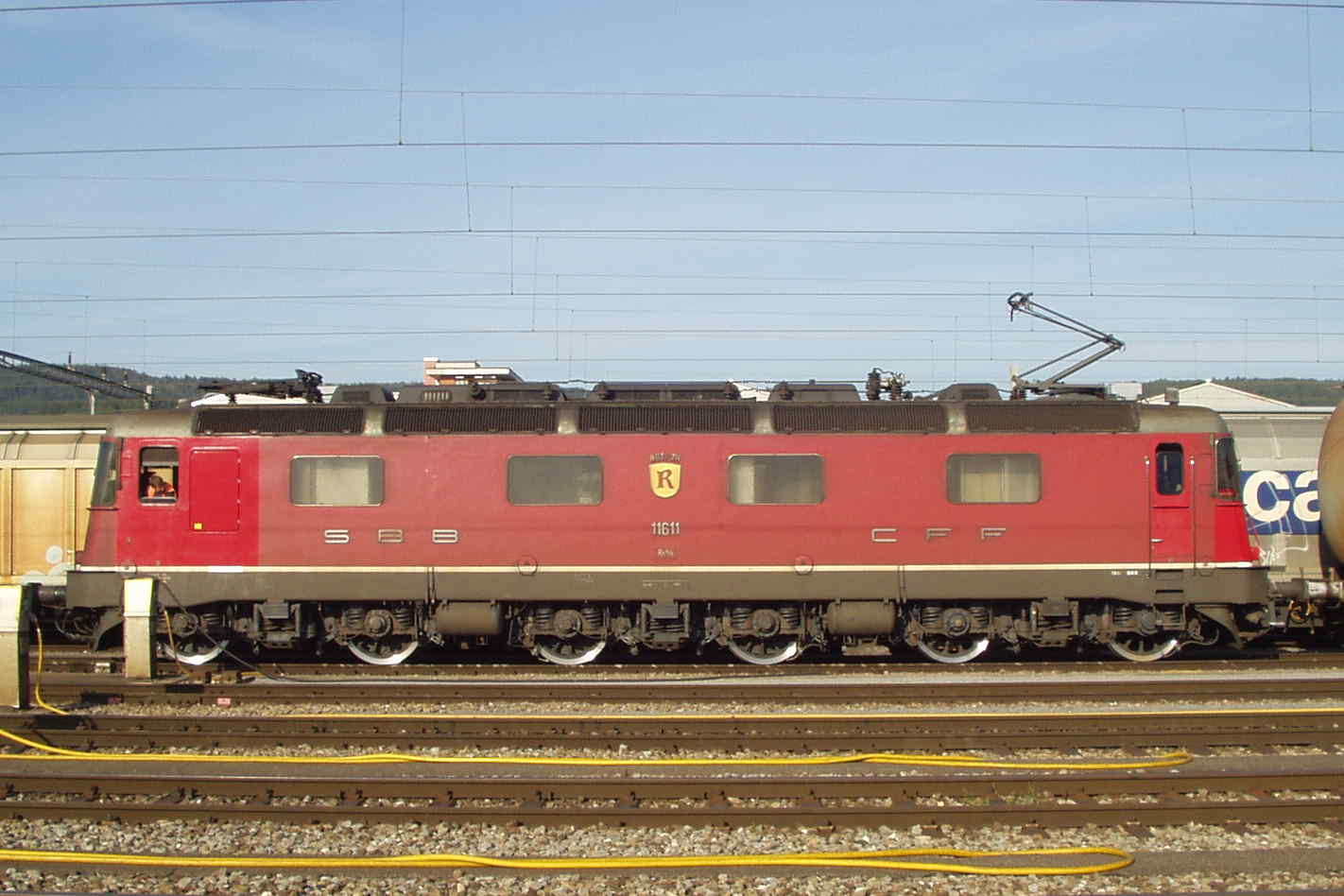
side view of Re 6/6 11611 with air conditioning

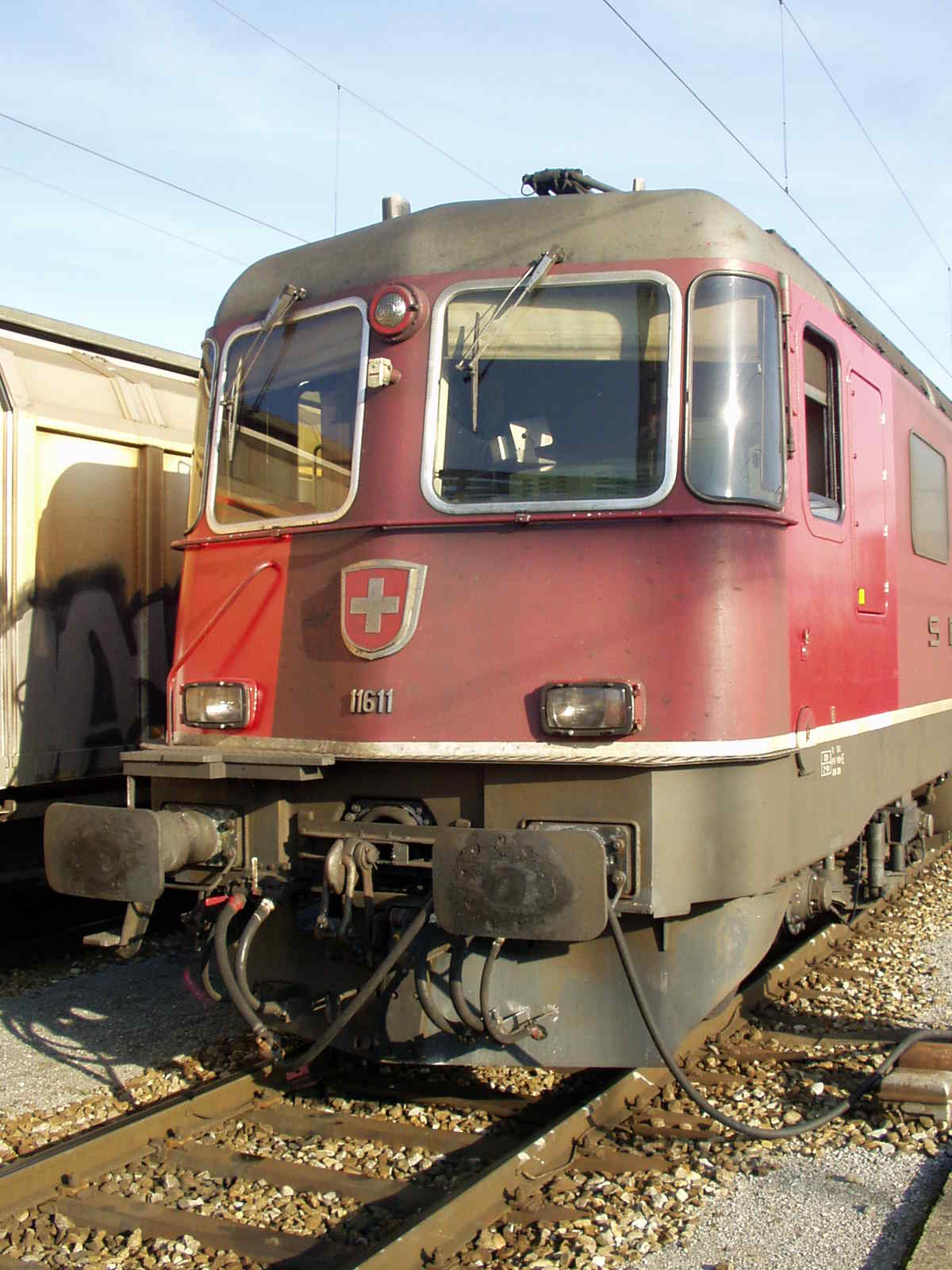
Front view of Re 6/6 11611 with air conditioning, UIC conforming plug, steps, headlights and red livery

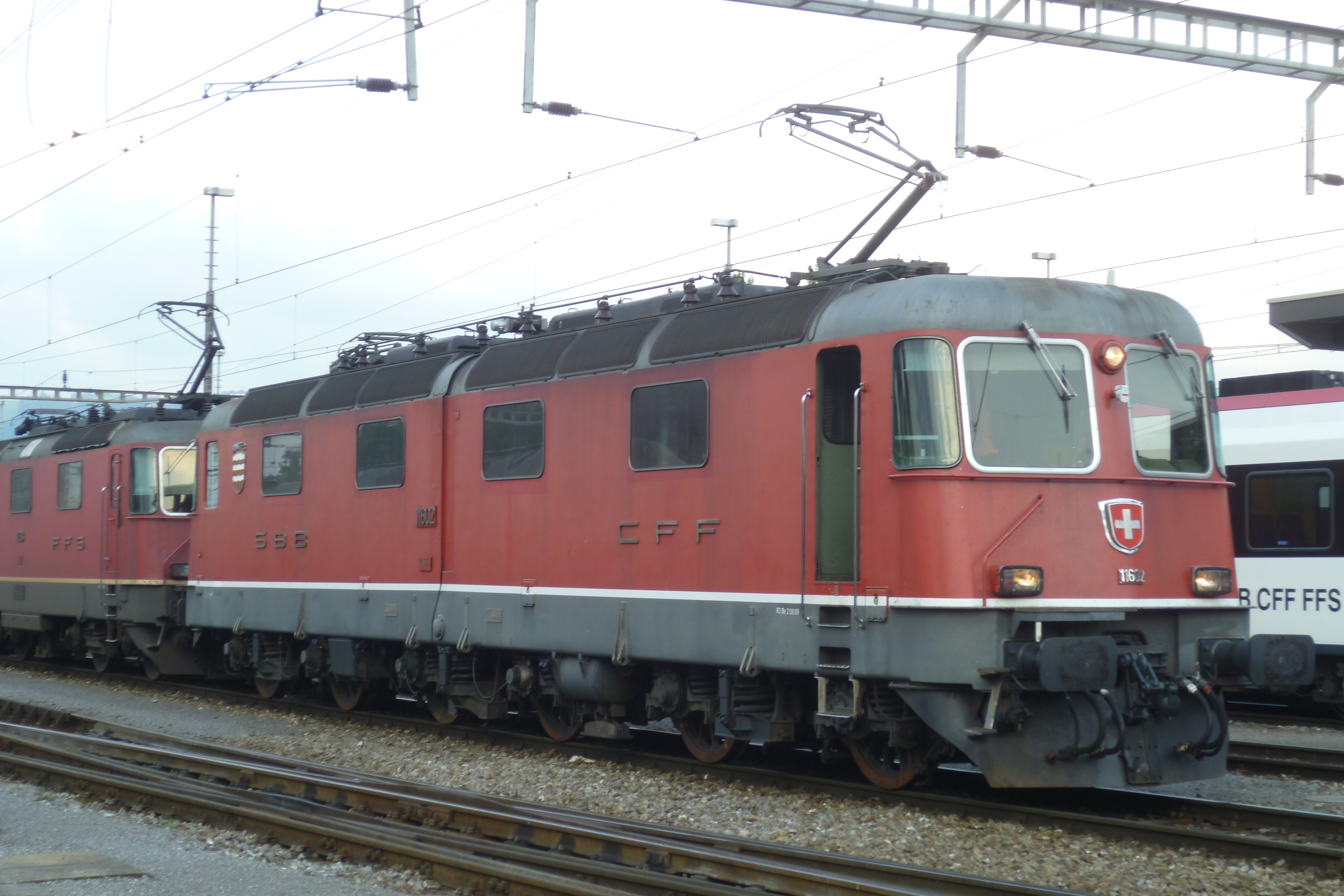
The first two prototypes 11601 and 11602 were built with joints in the body

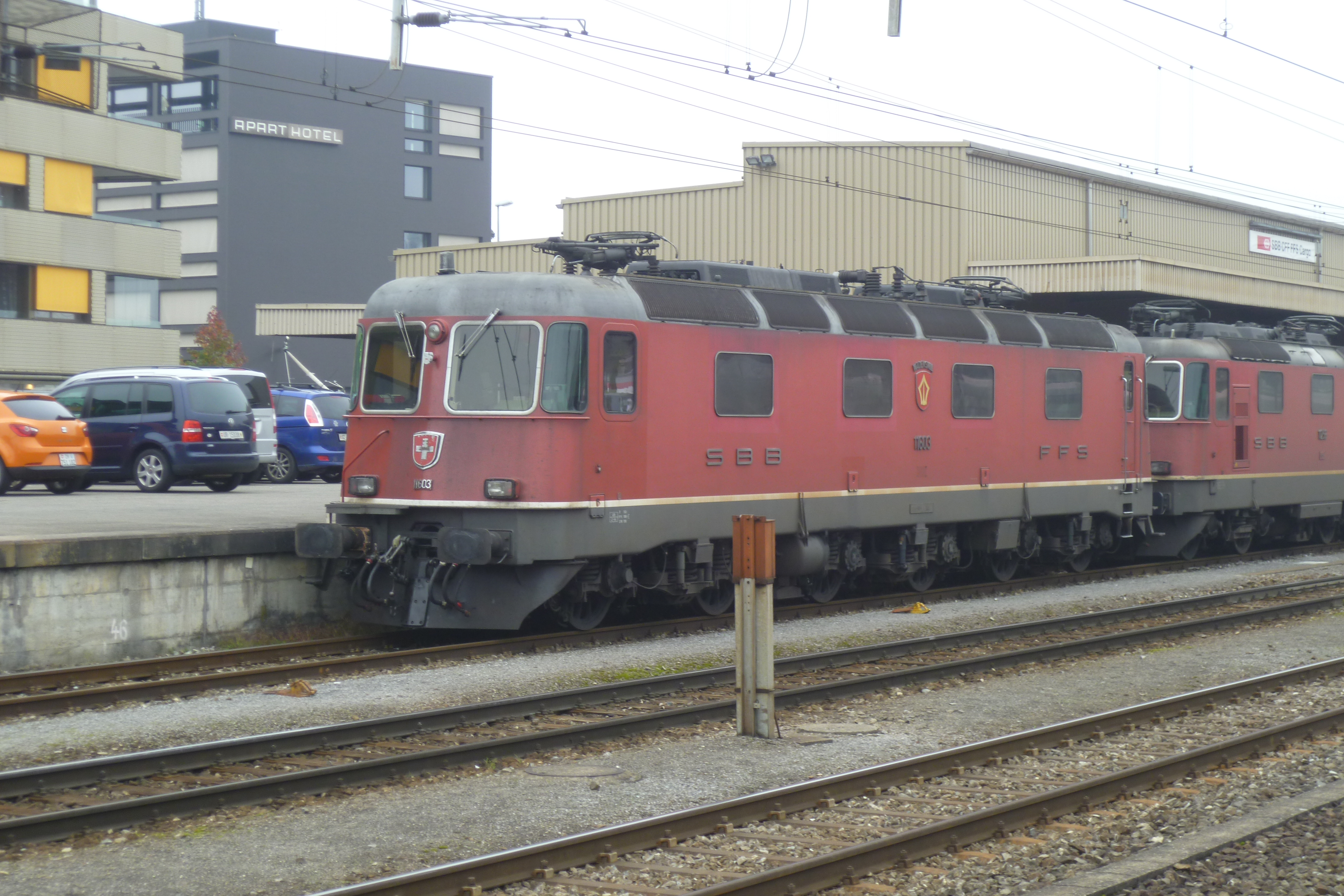
The second two prototypes 11603 and 11604 were built without joints in the body

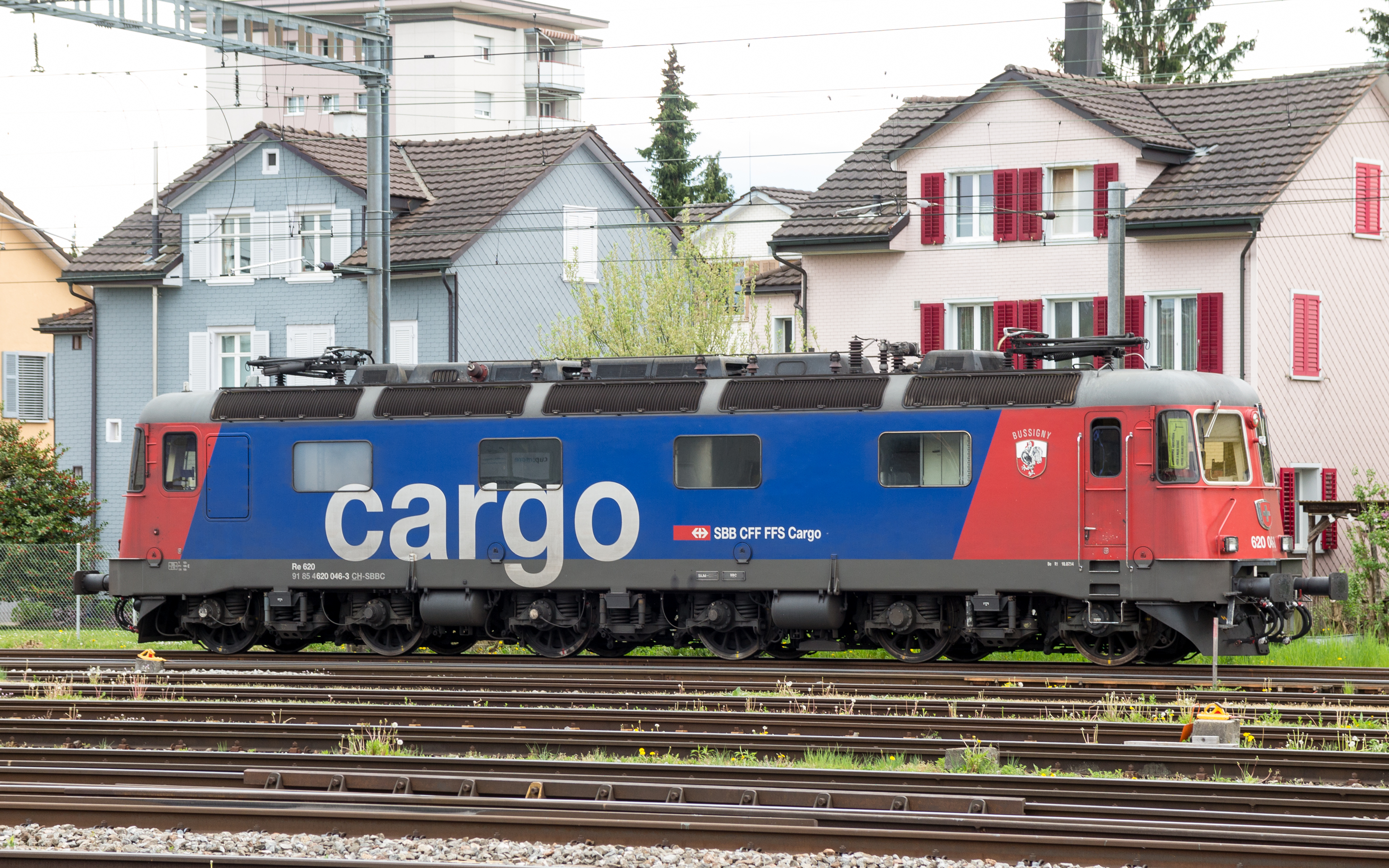
SBB Cargo Re 620 046-3 "Bussigny" in Wil

== See also ==
- List of stock used by Swiss Federal Railways
- Swiss locomotive and railcar classification
