= Class 380 =

Class 380 or 380 class may refer to:

- British Rail Class 380
- ČD Class 380
- China Railways CRH380A
- FS Class E.380
- LNWR 380 Class
- LSWR 380 class
