= E380 =

E380 may refer to:

- Triammonium citrate, a food additive known as E380 in the European E number system.
- FS Class E.380, a class of Italian electric locomotives
