= E19 =

E19 may refer to:

- Chūō Expressway (between Komaki JCT and Okaya on main route) and Nagano Expressway, route E19 in Japan
- DRG Class E 19
- European route E19
- HMS E19, a submarine
- Queen's Indian Defense, Encyclopaedia of Chess Openings code
- Sungai Besi–Ulu Klang Elevated Expressway, route E19 in Malaysia
