= FS Class E.332 =

Class E.332
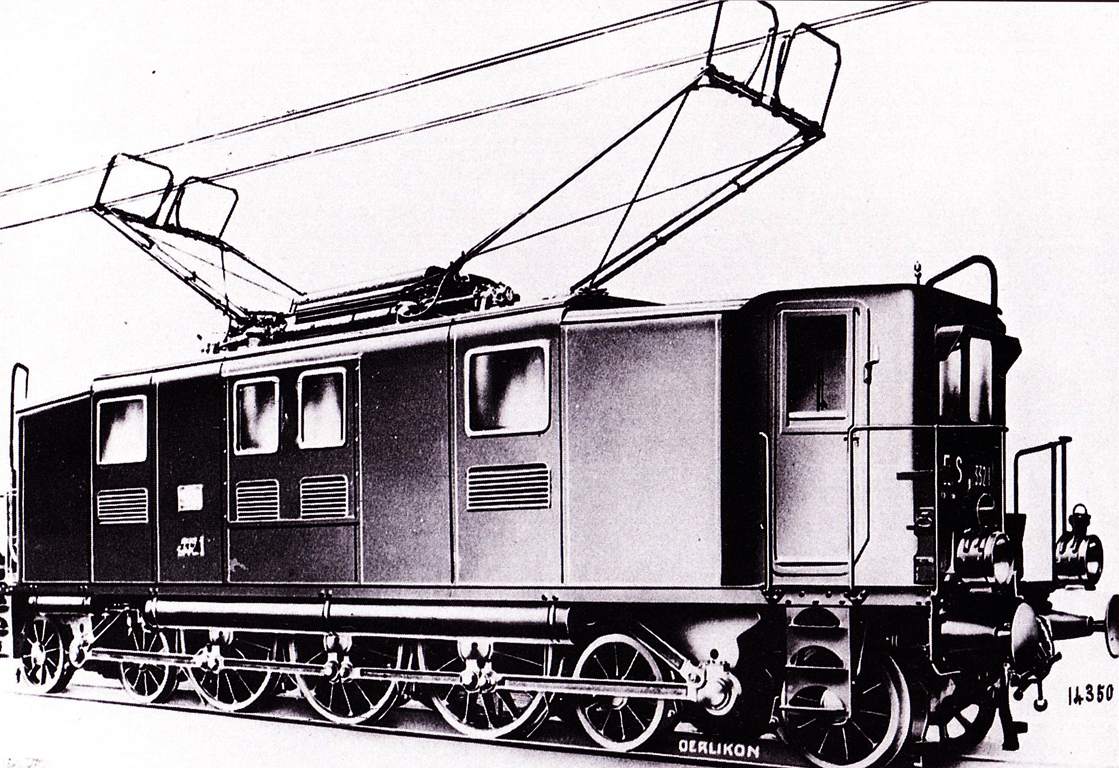
- Electric locomotive E.332.1 of the Italian State Railways
Type and origin
- Power type: electric
- Builder: Costruzioni Meccaniche di Saronno and Oerlikon
- Build date: 1914-1917
- Total produced: 6
Specifications
- Configuration
  - AAR: 2-C-2
  - UIC: 2′C2′
- Gauge: 1,435 mm (4 ft 8 1/2 in) standard gauge
- Leading dia.: 960 mm (38 in)
- Driver dia.: 1,630 mm (64 in)
- Trailing dia.: 960 mm (38 in)
- Adhesive weight: 48 tonnes (47 long tons; 53 short tons)
- Loco weight: 92.8 tonnes (91.3 long tons; 102.3 short tons)
- Electric system/s: Three-phase overhead line 3.6 kV, 16.7 Hz
Performance figures
- Maximum speed: 100 km/h (62 mph)
- Power output: 2,000 kW (2,700 hp)
Career
- Operators: FS

FS Class E.332 was a class of three-phase electric locomotives of the Italian State Railways (FS). They were used for the haulage of passenger trains between 1917 and 1963. Designed and built at the same time as the FS Class E.331, they represented an attempt by FS to extend the use of three-phase AC electric traction from primary to secondary routes. Their performance was disappointing and they were relegated to a marginal role, in which they remained despite several modifications.

== Overview ==
The good results of the experiments with, and then regular use of, the three-phase AC traction system, had, by 1912, induced the FS to order 45 locomotives of Class E.550 and 16 of Class E.330. The Material and Traction Service of FS now decided to consider the possibility of breaking the monopoly of the Italian Westinghouse Company (Società Italiana Westinghouse) with the acquisition of two new classes of locomotives for passenger trains, the E.331 and the E.332.

In the spring of 1913, FS prepared the design of the mechanical part to be used for both classes and, after long private negotiations, entrusted an order for the construction of 18 locomotives to the company Costruzioni Meccaniche di Saronno. The order was divided into two. The first, dated 14 December 1913, was for 6 machines to be built according to the design of the mechanical part prepared by the FS and with the electrical part designed and built by Ateliers de Construction Oerlikon of Oerlikon, Zurich, which gave rise to the Class E.332.

The second, dated early in 1914, was for 12 machines with an E (0-10-0) wheel arrangement, intended for the haulage of freight trains, which would have constituted a new Class 051 (E.551 according to the classification of 1914). The latter, however, were not built because of the termination of the contract, which took place in the spring of 1914 for unknown reasons.

Together with the Class E331, the Class E.332 formed the last chapter in the collaboration between the FS and Swiss industry in the field of three-phase electric traction.

== Numbering ==
The numbering in group 034 (0341–0346) originally planned was not adopted. All the machines entered service with the number E.332.1-6, adopted in the spring of 1914. The definitive numbering E.332.001-006, adopted in 1917, was practically applied in 1931.

As in all groups of three-phase alternating current system locomotives the second digit of the group number (034 and then E.332) indicated the machines with larger diameter wheels ("high wheels") intended for passenger trains.

In the definitive classification that came into force in 1917, the letter E. indicated an electric locomotive, the first digit 3 indicated the number of driving axles, the second 3 indicated machines with "high wheels" and the third digit indicated the chronological number of the project.

The identification plates affixed to the sides led, as a rule, to the marking FS 332.001 (and following) without the letter E. This was probably because the numbering was carried out in 1931 at the Grandi Riparazioni workshop in Rimini which, specializing in steam locomotives, did not have a mould for the letter "E".

== Technical details ==
=== Mechanical part ===
The running gear allowed good riding on curves at high speed, especially on the tortuous lines of the Ligurian Riviera, in particular on the Genoa - Sampierdarena - Savona line, which was electrified on 1 September 1916.

Inspired by the E.3101 locomotive of the French Chemin de Fer du Midi, a 2'C2' wheel arrangement was used, with sloped connecting rods and jackshafts. This choice was dictated by the need to connect the large motors (2.14 m [7.0 ft] diameter), located in the central part of the body, to the wheels without using the patented V-shaped connecting rod of the E.330.

The design of the body, containing the two control cabs, motors, and electrical and pneumatic equipment, was similar to that of the Class E.331.

=== Electrical part ===
The traction circuit was designed and patented by the Oerlikon engineers. It provided two cascade connections (6 and 8 poles) and two parallel connections (also 6 and 8 poles). The starting rheostat was of cast iron, divided into 16 steps and controlled by an electro-pneumatic switch. It, together with the motors, needed energetic cooling, and this was provided by two electric fans with a total power of 12 kW. Overheating was a constant problem and often caused breakdowns.

== Construction ==
According to the contract, the class should have been delivered by September 1915, but the entry of Italy into the First World War pushed all industries to favour the construction of military equipment with consequent delays to orders for civilian materials, such as locomotives. This led to a delay of about two years in deliveries, which were made as follows:

Locomotive	Date of delivery	Date scrapped
E.332.001	March 1917	July 1964
E.332.002	July 1917	August 1964
E.332.003	August 1917	October 1963
E.332.004	September 1917	November 1963
E.332.005	September 1917	August 1964
E.332.006	November 1917	June 1964

The works plates show the year of construction as 1915, so it appears that construction was already well advanced at the beginning of the hostilities.

== Performance ==
According to the project specification, the E.332 should have delivered four speeds that, at the voltage of 3700 V and the frequency of 16.7 Hz, should have been 37, 50, 75, and 100 km/h (23, 31, 47, and 62 mph). At these speeds, tractive effort should have been 88, 88, 93, and 59 kN (20,000, 20,000, 21,000, and 13,000 lbf).

These values were not achieved, owing to some incorrect assumptions in the design of the electrical equipment, especially regarding the combination with the cascaded motors. The defects were most obvious at low speeds.

Following modifications in 1917–1918, working on the Giovi branch line, they could independently haul a 230-tonne (230-long-ton; 250-short-ton) train (i.e. five 1921 type carriages) at a speed of 75 km/h (47 mph). On the Genoa - La Spezia line, from 1925 onwards, they could haul loads up to 410 tonnes (400 long tons; 450 short tons) at the first three running speeds, with performance equivalent to that of the E.333.

After the war, on the Genoa - La Spezia line, the following loads were permitted:

- At 37 and 50 km/h (23 and 31 mph), 430 tonnes (420 long tons; 470 short tons)
- At 75 km/h (47 mph), 400 tonnes (390 long tons; 440 short tons)
- At 100 km/h (62 mph), 300 tonnes (300 long tons; 330 short tons)

Statistics published by FS in 1938 showed that the overall reliability of the class had improved to match the average for three-phase locomotive classes.

== Service ==
From 1917 to 1925 Class E.332 served on the Genoa - Savona line and on the Giovi branch. From 1925 they were assigned to hauling passenger trains along the Riviera di Levante (Genoa - La Spezia line). Following the contraction of traffic generated by the economic crisis of 1929, the whole class was stored at the Rimini repair shops and remained there until 1934. From 1934 all were assigned to Turin, where they hauled trains on all the flat lines, or those with modest gradients, radiating from the Turin. Occasionally they worked trains destined for Genoa and Savona.

== Depots ==
The locomotives were allocated to the following depots:

- From 1917 to 1921: Rivarolo Ligure
- From 1921 to 1925: Rivarolo Ligure and Genoa Piazza Principe
- From 1925 to 1931: Genoa (Terralba)
- Shortly before storage at Rimini, one unit was assigned to the Florence depot, presumably for trial runs to Pistoia and Porrettana
- From 1934: Turin
- From 1961: Savona

== Nicknames ==
The E.332s, like the E.331s, were dubbed "Assassins" and "Coffins" due to fatal accidents caused by the placement of electrical equipment (particularly the main switch, cooled with oil) behind the cabs without adequate protection in the event of an explosion.

== Preservation ==
No units have been preserved
