= FS Class E.431 =

Class E.431
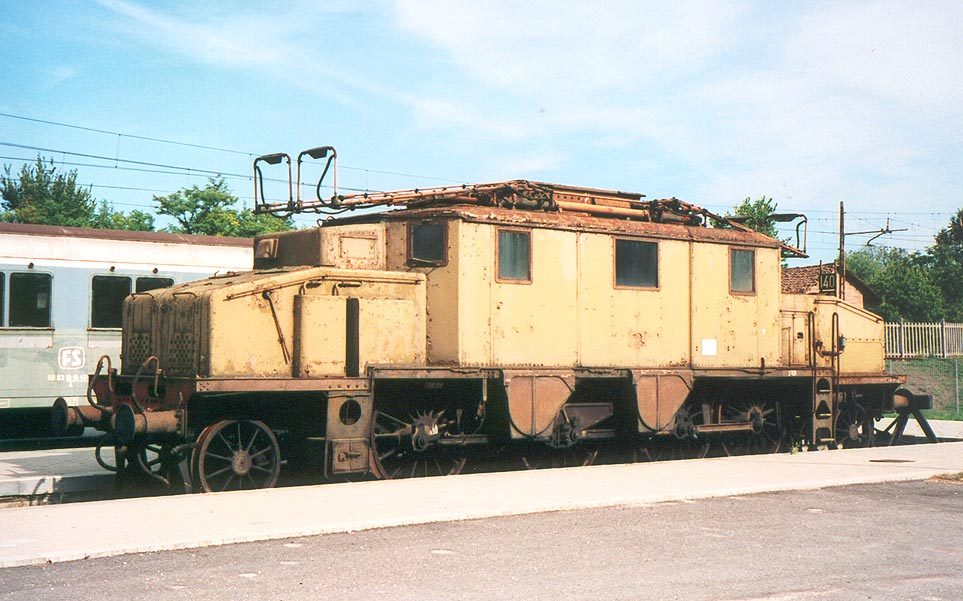
- Italian 3-phase locomotive FS Class E.431 at the railway museum in Savigliano, Italy
Type and origin
- Power type: electric
- Builder: Tecnomasio Italiano-Brown-Boveri and Ansaldo
- Build date: 1922-1925
- Total produced: 37
Specifications
- Configuration
  - AAR: 1-D-1
  - UIC: 1′D1′
- Gauge: 1,435 mm (4 ft 8 1/2 in) standard gauge
- Driver dia.: 1,630 mm (64 in)
- Loco weight: 91 tonnes (90 long tons; 100 short tons)
- Electric system/s: Three-phase overhead line 3.6 kV, 16.7 Hz
Performance figures
- Maximum speed: 100 km/h (62 mph)
- Power output: 2,000 kW (2,700 hp)
Career
- Operators: FS
- Disposition: Two preserved

The FS Class E.431 was a class of three-phase AC electric locomotives of the Italian State Railways (FS).

== History ==
The E.431 was a class of 37 locomotives, built between 1922 and 1925 by Tecnomasio Italiano-Brown-Boveri (TIBB), divided into three batches, the last in collaboration with Ansaldo. The locomotives were designed and constructed to be suitable for hauling heavy trains at 100 km/h (62 mph), which, at the time, was considered the limit for the three-phase system. The extension of the electrified network with the three-phase system had come to involve the regions of Piedmont, Liguria and part of Lombardy. This included the cities of Turin, Genoa and indirectly Milan. With associated lines, international transits were possible. These lines were used by fast and important international trains with heavy loads (up to 20 carriages) hence the need for machines suitable for this type of service.

In practice, the E.431 did not live up to expectations. In particular, the cascade connection of the motors at the lower speeds gave insufficient tractive effort, affecting performance during starting and uphill travel. They were not, therefore, used on the Frejus and Brenner lines, while on the remaining climbs, in particular on those that lead from the Ligurian coast to the hinterland, they were always used in multiple. These problems were solved, even if not definitively, with Class E.432 which had different control systems. On the flat, the E.431s could show off their speed, hauling the trains for which they were designed, but even here they sometimes worked in multiple. Some attempts to improve performance when running in cascade mode were made during the early years of service but they were not very successful.

With the conversion of the three-phase lines to direct current operation, the E.431s were progressively withdrawn but some locomotives remained in service on local trains until the end of the three-phase system occurred in 1976.

== Technical features ==
=== Mechanical part ===
The E.431 was the first three-phase locomotive for passenger trains to have four-axle drive, to increase the adhesive weight. Each end drive axle was linked to the adjacent carrier axle by a Zara bogie. This arrangement, also adopted in many other locomotives, allowed better curve registration given the generally tortuous route of the lines in Italy. The two motors drove through a triangular connecting rod and horizontal coupling rods transmitted the motion from the driving axle to the coupled axles. The wheels were of the type used on steam locomotives, with balance weights and cranks at 90 degrees.

On a sturdy frame there was a central cabin in which the two traction motors, which were dismountable from below, were placed. At the ends there were two short bonnets which contained the auxiliary equipment, including fans, rheostat, compressors and brake reservoirs, as well as a reversing switch for the selection of the direction of travel.

=== Electrical part ===
The electrical part consisted of two traction motors whose stators were switchable between six or eight poles. With the cascade connection, in which the current induced in the rotor of one motor fed the stator of the other motor, both motors ran at half speed. The available speeds were:

- Cascade connection, 37.5 and 50 km/h (23.3 and 31.1 mph)
- Parallel connection, 75 and 100 km/h (47 and 62 mph)

The current limitation during starting and switching was obtained through a liquid rheostat containing a 2% solution of sodium carbonate in water as electrolyte. The electrolyte was cooled by a heat exchanger which transferred heat to another liquid circuit containing fresh water.

Current was picked up from the overhead line through two trolley poles with "spades" - a pattern common in three-phase locomotives of the time.

=== Multiple unit control ===
After the encouraging results obtained with the small-wheeled locomotives FS Class E.551 and FS Class E.554, it was decided to extend the experiment with "Ligurian" multiple unit control to some large-wheeled locomotives. The locomotives chosen for the experiment included two Class E.333 and E.431.023 and 026. The chosen machines, modified in the early months of 1960, behaved well in multiple control, demonstrating the validity of the solution adopted.

The success of the "Ligurian" multiple control led to the idea of adopting it as standard equipment on all three-phase locomotives, excluding only the oldest types. For Class E.431 the transformation of a further eight units was arranged, but it was only performed on two of them. These were E.431.018 and E.431.036. On this pair of locomotives, a high voltage coupling was added which allowed the second unit to operate with lowered trolleys, in order to avoid a speed limit imposed on double-traction locomotives on the Turin - Fossano - Ceva line.

== Preservation ==
E.431.027 is exhibited at the Savigliano site of the Piedmont Railway Museum (MFP) and E.431.037 is in the Technical Museum of Speyer, in the Rhineland-Palatinate.
