= Rhaetian Railway Ge 2/4 =

Swiss electric locomotive

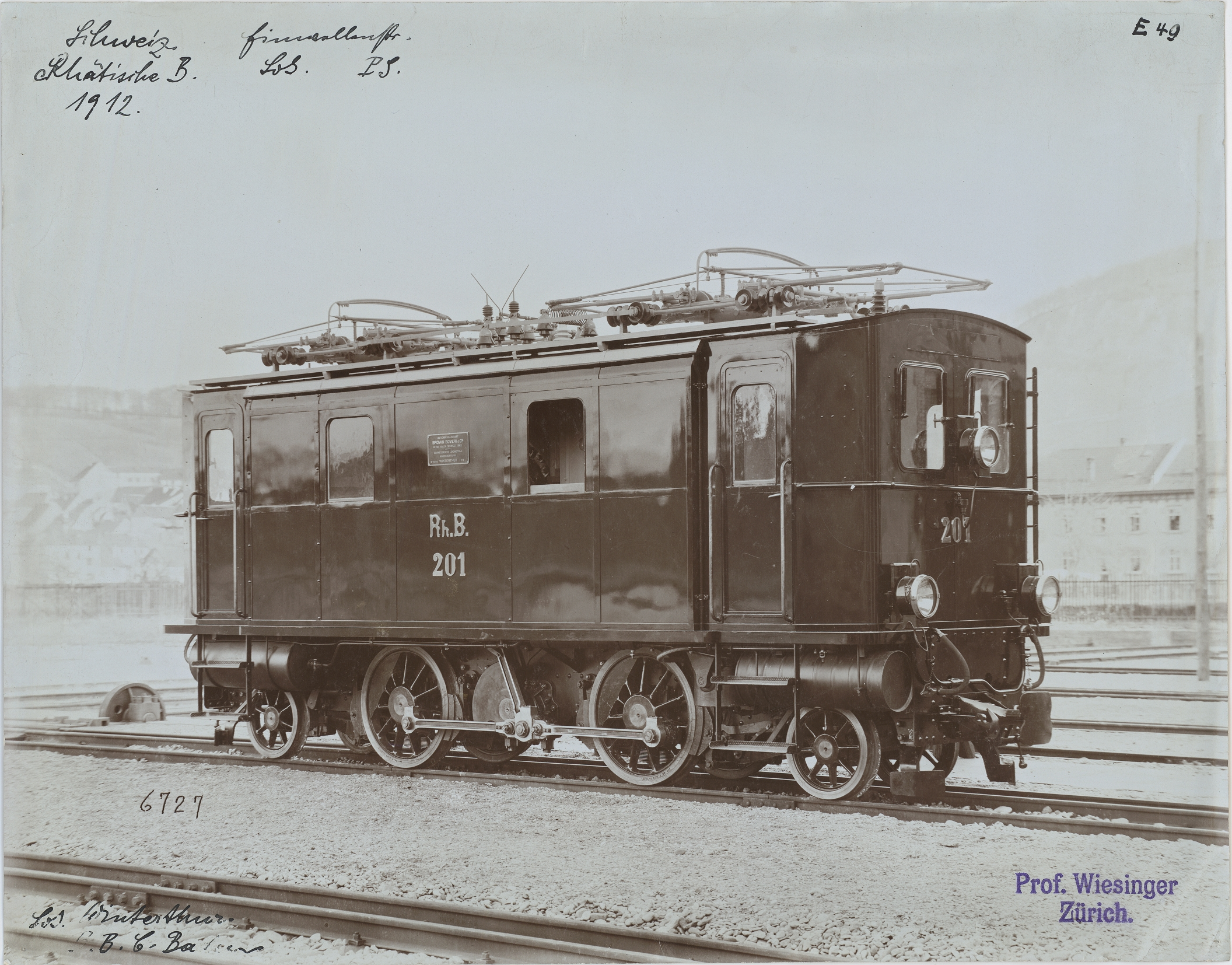
- Ge 2/4 No. 201
Type and origin
- Power type: Electric
- Builder: SLM and BBC
- Build date: 1912–1913
- Total produced: 7
- Rebuild date: 1943–1946
Specifications
- Configuration
  - Whyte: 2-4-2OE
  - UIC: 1′B1′
- Gauge: 1,000 mm (3 ft 3 3/8 in)
- Leading dia.: 710 mm (2 ft 4 in)
- Driver dia.: 1,070 mm (3 ft 6 in)
- Trailing dia.: 710 mm (2 ft 4 in)
- Wheelbase: 6,000 mm (19 ft 8 in)
- Length: 8,700 mm (28 ft 7 in); With snowplough: 9,448 mm (31 ft 0 in)
- Width: 2,650 mm (8 ft 8 in)
- Height: 4,050 mm (13 ft 3 in)
- Loco weight: Originally: 36.7 tonnes (36.1 long tons; 40.5 short tons); Rebuilt: 30 to 33 tonnes (29.5 to 32.5 long tons; 33.1 to 36.4 short tons)
- Electric system/s: 11 kV 16.7 Hz Overhead
- Current pickup: Pantograph
Performance figures
- Maximum speed: Originally: 50 km/h (31 mph); Rebuilt: 55 to 65 km/h (34 to 40 mph)
- Power output: Originally: 228 kW (306 hp)
- Tractive effort: 26 kN (5,850 lbf)
Career
- Operators: Rhaetian Railway
- Numbers: 201–207
- Locale: Graubünden, Switzerland
- Retired: 1974–2006
- Current owner: Rhaetian Railway
- Disposition: One still operational

The Rhaetian Railway Ge 2/4 was a class of metre gauge 1′B1′ electric locomotives formerly operated by the Rhaetian Railway (RhB), which is the main railway network in the Canton of Graubünden, Switzerland. Four members of the class are now preserved, with one of them in operational condition.

The class was so named under the Swiss locomotive and railcar classification system. According to that system, Ge 2/4 denotes a narrow gauge electric adhesion locomotive with a total of four axles, two of which are drive axles.

== Technical details ==
=== As delivered ===
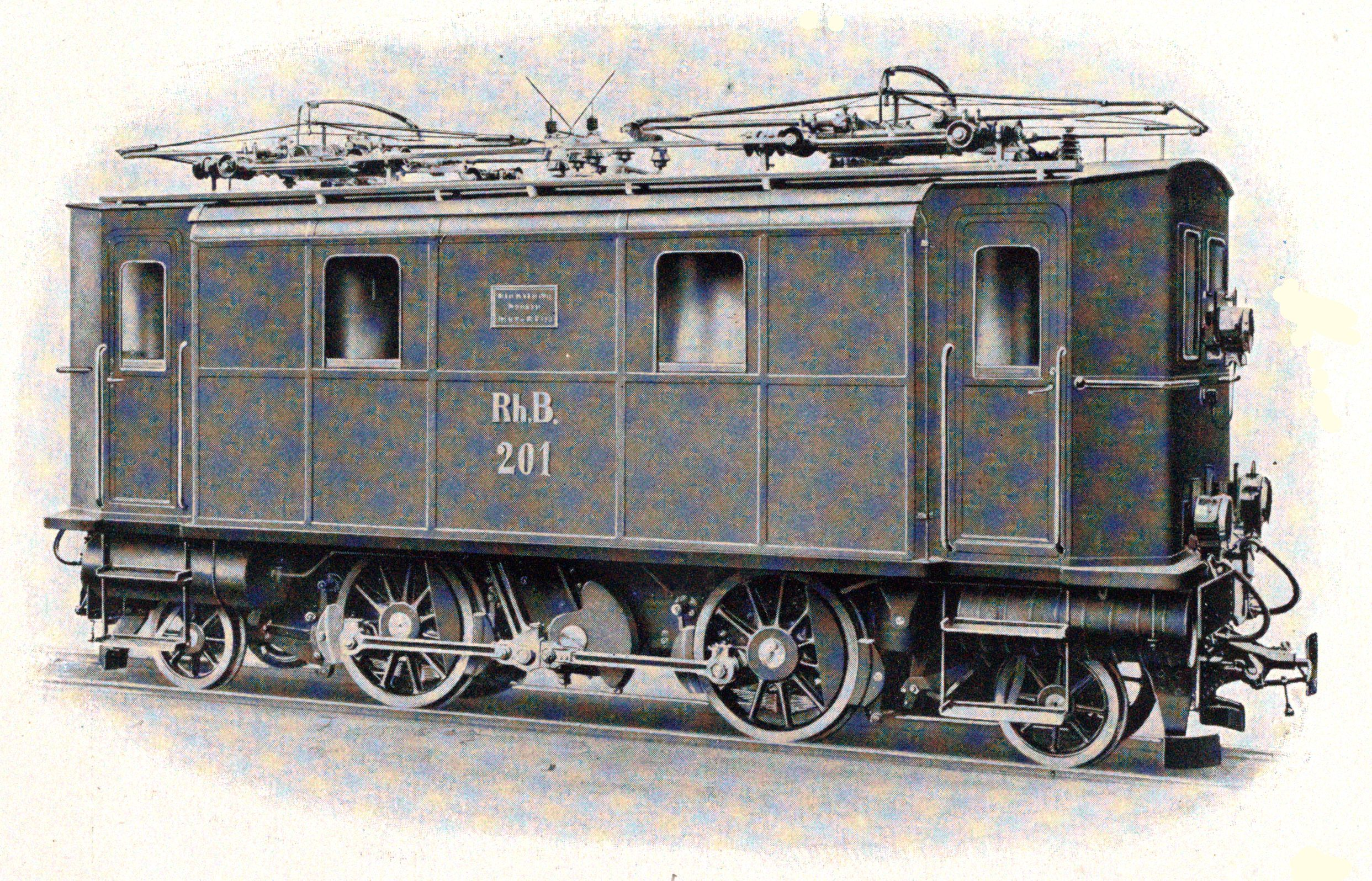
SBB Historic - RhB Ge 2/4 201

In 1912-1913, the Rhaetian Railway purchased seven examples of the Ge 2/4, numbered 201 to 207, for the newly constructed and electrified Engadin line. The 8.7-metre (29 ft) long locomotives had a top speed of 45 kilometres per hour (28 mph) and a power output of 228 kilowatts (306 hp). They also weighed 36.7 tonnes (36.1 long tons; 40.5 short tons). Their mechanical components were manufactured by the Swiss Locomotive and Machine Works (SLM), while Brown, Boveri & Cie (BBC) furnished the electrical components. To drive the Ge 2/4s, repulsion motors were used, as these motors were characterised by a high torque and shock-free startup.

=== Rebuilds ===
Between 1943 and 1946, three Ge 2/4 machines were rebuilt as shunting locomotives, with a new single phase motor and a central driver's cab. In the vernacular, they then received the name Bügeleisen (flat iron). The rebuilt locomotives were given the numbers Gea 2/4 211, Ge 2/4 212 and 213, their service weight was reduced to 33 tonnes (32 long tons; 36 short tons), and their top speed increased to 55 kilometres per hour (34 mph).

In 1945 and 1946, two further Ge 2/4s were rebuilt with a new single phase motor. These two machines, renumbered as Ge 2/4 221 and 222 were not outwardly altered, but their weight was reduced to only 30 tonnes (30 long tons; 33 short tons), their power output was increased to 450 kilowatts (600 hp), and their top speed also increased to 55 kilometres per hour (34 mph). They then soon began rendering service as pilot locomotives on the Albula Railway.

== Preservation ==
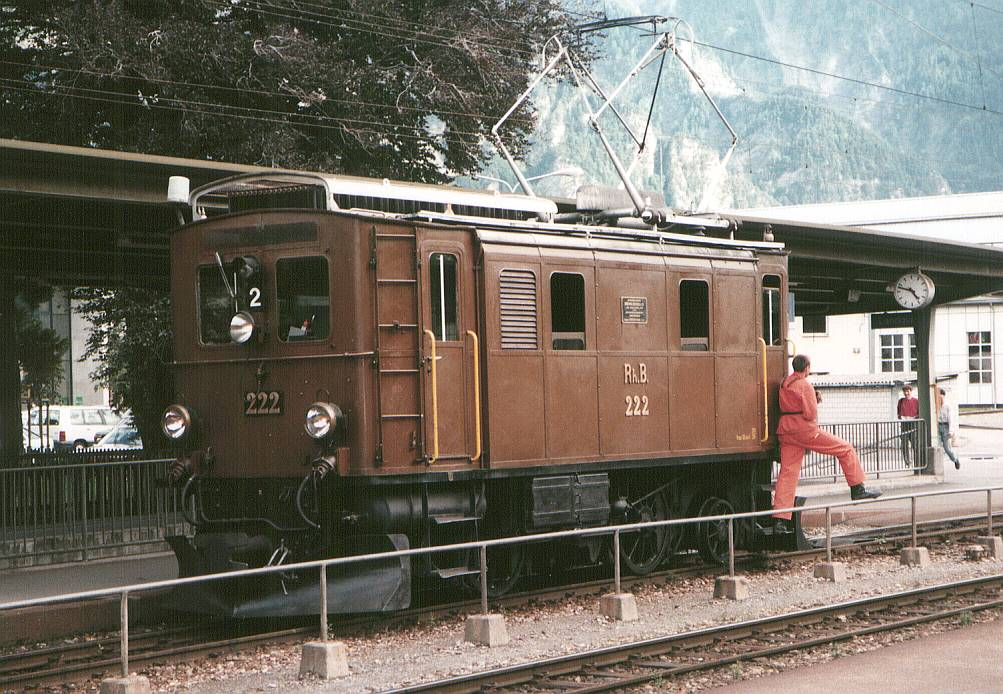
Ge 2/4 222

The two unrebuilt locomotives, numbered 205 and 207, are both still in existence. No. 205 stood until November 2007 as a memorial locomotive in front of the Zurich University of Applied Sciences in Winterthur. Originally, this locomotive was intended to be a part of the, then in the planning stage, Albula railway museum. The Rhaetian Railway's preservation society, Club 1889, is currently investigating other means of displaying the locomotive in the open air, but shielded from the weather, after completion of ongoing restoration work. Meanwhile, no. 207 can be seen on display at the Swiss Transport Museum in Lucerne.

The last remaining example of the first three rebuilt locomotives (Ge 2/4 212) was withdrawn from service as recently as 2006, and is also now preserved. It has been transformed back into its original 1940s condition, and sold to a private company that wants to set up the locomotive outside a planned model railway layout in Fribourg.

Ge 2/4 no. 222 from the second batch of rebuilds is the fourth preserved example of the class; it is based in Landquart as a heritage locomotive.

== List of locomotives ==
List of the Ge 2/4 locomotives of the Rhaetian Railway
Traffic number	Commissioning	Rebuilt	Withdrawal	Current whereabouts
201	27.12.1912	1943 → 213	1992	Scrapped after an accident
202	25.01.1913	1943 → 211	2001	Scrapped
203	16.04.1913	1946 → 221	1998	Scrapped
204	26.04.1913	1946 → 222	--	Operational preserved locomotive
205	17.05.1913	1928 → Equipping of both cabs with communication doors.	1974	Functional monument since 1974 (static display) in Winterthur. Since the end of November 2007, in Arth-Goldau for restoration (only as a functional monument (static display)).
206	06.06.1913	1946 → 212	2006	Monument since 2007 in Fribourg
207	26.06.1913	--	1974	On display since 1982 in the Swiss Transport Museum in Lucerne.

== See also ==
- History of rail transport in Switzerland
- Rail transport in Switzerland
