= 2C2 3100 =

Class of French electric locomotives

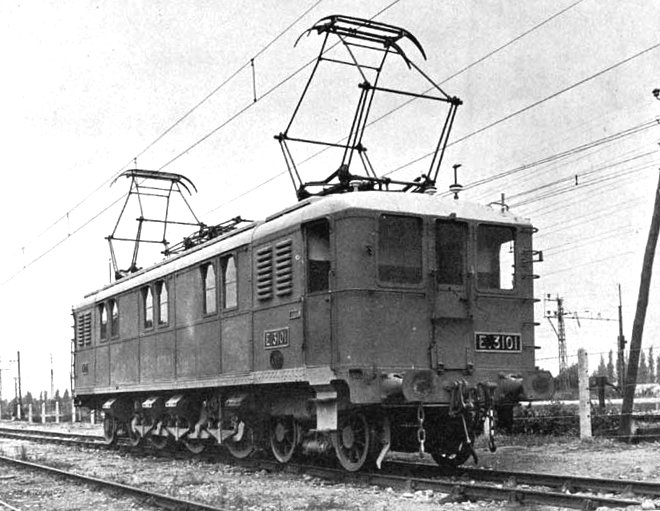
- Midi 2C2 E 3101
Type and origin
- Power type: Electric
- Builder: Constructions Electriques de France (CEF)
- Build date: 1923-1926
- Total produced: 10
Specifications
- Configuration
  - Whyte: 2-6-2
  - AAR: 2-Co-2
  - UIC: 2′Co2′
- Gauge: 1,435 mm (4 ft 8 1/2 in)
- Wheel diameter: 1750 mm
- Trailing dia.: 900 mm
- Adhesive weight: 57 tonnes
- Loco weight: 105.75 tonnes
- Power supply: Overhead line
- Electric system/s: 1500 V DC
- Current pickup(s): 2 pantographs
- Traction motors: Dick Kerr
Performance figures
- Maximum speed: 120 km/h
- Power output: 1360 kW

The 2C2 3100 were a class of electric locomotives of the Chemins de fer du Midi, France. They were ordered in 1914 but, because of the First World War, deliveries did not begin until 1923. They were designed for alternating current at 12 kV, 16 2/3 Hz but, before construction, they were re-designed for direct current at 1,500 V.

== History ==
These locomotives were ordered from Constructions Electriques de France (CEF), Tarbes in 1914 following the decision to electrify the Midi network at 12 kV 16 2/3 Hz and to order six prototypes locomotives. Their delivery was delayed by the First World War and then by the government decision of 1920 to adopt 1,500 V direct current for new electrification schemes. It was not until 1923 that the first two prototypes began their tests. The original livery was blue.

== Technical details ==
The machines were initially designed with three Westinghouse motors arranged horizontally but were re-designed with 1,500 V Dick Kerr motors arranged vertically and, presumably, driving through bevel gears. It is unclear whether there were three or six 1,500 V motors. If there were only three, it is likely that they would have had double armatures to allow series-parallel operation.

== Career ==
They were the first French electric locomotives designed to reach, and even exceed, 120 km / h. For a time, they held the global blue ribbon for speed with an average of 108 km / h on the Bordeaux - Bayonne route. Later, with the increase in train weight, following the arrival of metal carriages, they were seen as underpowered and were replaced by the 2D2 locomotives of the Compagnie du chemin de fer de Paris à Orléans (PO).

== Scale models ==
The 2C2 3100 was reproduced in HO scale by the British manufacturer DJH / Model Loco, as a kit (white metal and brass) to be assembled and painted.

== See also ==
- Rigid-framed electric locomotives
