= DRG Class E 19 =

Deutsche Reichsbahn Baureihe E 19
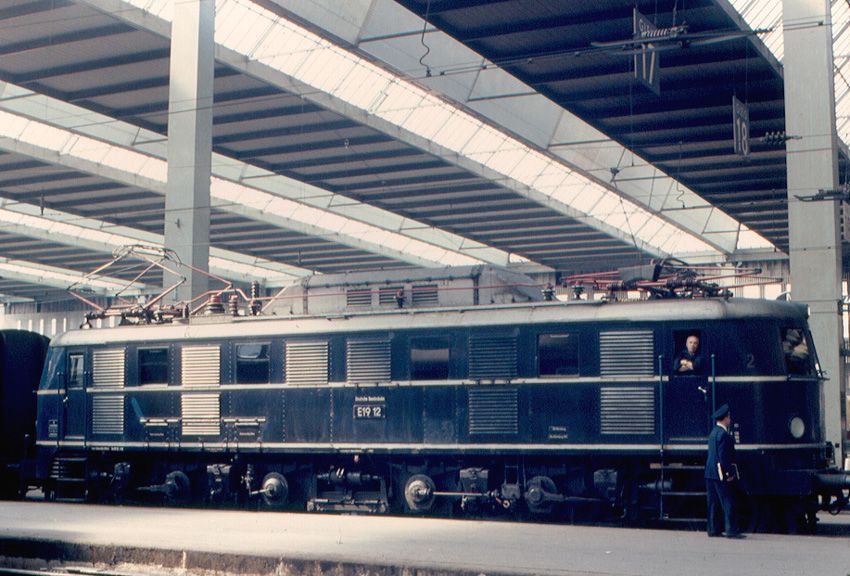
- E 19 12 at Munich central station, 1967
Type and origin
- Power type: Electric
- Builder: AEG (2), Siemens and Henschel (2)
- Build date: 1938
- Total produced: 4
Specifications
- Configuration
  - UIC: 1′Do1′
- Gauge: 1,435 mm (4 ft 8 1/2 in)
- Leading dia.: 1,100 mm (43.31 in)
- Driver dia.: 1,600 mm (62.99 in)
- Length: 16.92 m (55 ft 6 in)
- Loco weight: 110.7 tonnes (109.0 long tons; 122.0 short tons)
- Electric system/s: 15 kV 16 2/3 Hz AC Catenary
- Current pickup(s): Pantograph
- Traction motors: Four double traction motors (8 motors in total)
Performance figures
- Maximum speed: Design: 225 km/h (140 mph); Service: 180 km/h (112 mph) later 140 km/h (87 mph)
- Power output: E19.0 Continuous: 3,720 kW (4,989 hp); E19.1 Continuous: 3,460 kW (4,640 hp); E19.0 One-hour: 4,000 kW (5,364 hp); E19.1 One-hour: 4,080 kW (5,471 hp)
Career
- Operators: Deutsche Reichsbahn; → Deutsche Bundesbahn
- Class: E 19 → 119
- Numbers: E 19.01, E 19.02; E 19.11, E 19.12; → 119.001, 119.002, 119.011, 119.012
- Withdrawn: 1975–1978
- Disposition: Two preserved, two scrapped

The electric locomotives of the class E 19 (class 119 from 1968) were the fastest electric locomotives of the Deutsche Reichsbahn. In regular service, they were restricted to a maximum speed of 180 km/h, but the locomotives were designed for travel speeds of up to 225 km/h. At the time of their presentation, they were the most powerful single frame locomotives ever built.

== History ==
In 1937, Deutsche Reichsbahn proposed electric locomotives for the route Berlin-Halle (Saale)-Munich to provide a high-speed service with a top speed of 180 km/h and a speed of 60 km/h on the gradients of the Franconian Forest Railway, with an option of increasing speeds to over 200 km/h in the near future.

Orders were placed with AEG and Siemens/Henschel for two locomotives each. AEG built locomotives with serial numbers E 19 01 and E 19 02, and those built by Siemens/Henschel were numbered E 19 11 and E 19 12. Both types were developed from the successful class E 18. The helical spring gear and rigid 1′Do1′ frame were taken largely unchanged from the E 18. However, in anticipation of the higher loads, the suspension was strengthened and power output increased by 500 kW (671 hp). Length over buffers is the same as E 18, and external differences are mainly in the arrangement of fans and windows. Since the Reichsbahn also wanted to make a comparison between the two biggest electrical companies in Germany, especially in the field of power electronics, the delivered locomotives were slightly different from each other. The two built by AEG (subclass E 19.0) were a modernized version of the E 18. The enclosure panels were welded instead of riveted and the engines were fitted with a modified precision regulator, which, despite smoother switching transitions, only had 20 speed steps (compared to 29 on the E 18). The other two by Siemens/Henschel (subclass E 19.1) were of a more conventional riveted construction, but had a modern dynamic brake to keep braking distances as short as possible. This resulted in a distinctive hump-like roof structure compared to the E 19.0.

The E 19 01 entered service in 1938 with a black frame and burgundy body with white pinstripes. Extensive testing was conducted on all four locomotives in 1939–1940. Because of World War II no more were built. High-speed tests at up to 225 km/h were planned, but never took place. The E 19 01 and 02 could not adhere to the standard braking distance of 1000 meters because of insufficient braking power. It was hoped that the new electric brakes of the E 19 11 and 12 would solve this problem, but they could not be tested thoroughly before the war. As such, there was no conclusion to whether the E 19 could have reached the planned top speed in normal service.

== Deutsche Bundesbahn ==
All four locomotives were transferred to the Deutsche Bundesbahn. The top speed had already been reduced to 140 km/h in the 1950s by a gearbox and motor conversion, to make them more suitable for their new main application on the Franconian Forest Railway. The two surviving museum locomotives still have this configuration and have not been restored to their original state. The livery was later changed to blue/black. The locomotives were stationed at the Nuremberg depot and mainly used between Nuremberg on the Franconian Forest (Frankenwald) and Probstzella in the DDR, as well as between Nuremberg and Regensburg. At times they were stationed at Hagen. The last E 19 (119 002) was retired in 1978, the others having been taken out of service in 1975 and 1977.

== Preservation ==
E 19 01 and 12 have been preserved. E 19 01 is stationed at the German Museum of Technology in Berlin, with red livery. The E 19 12, stationed at the Nuremberg Transport Museum, was also restored to the original red livery after the "150 years of rail transport in Germany" anniversary. 119 002 and 011 were scrapped at Munich.

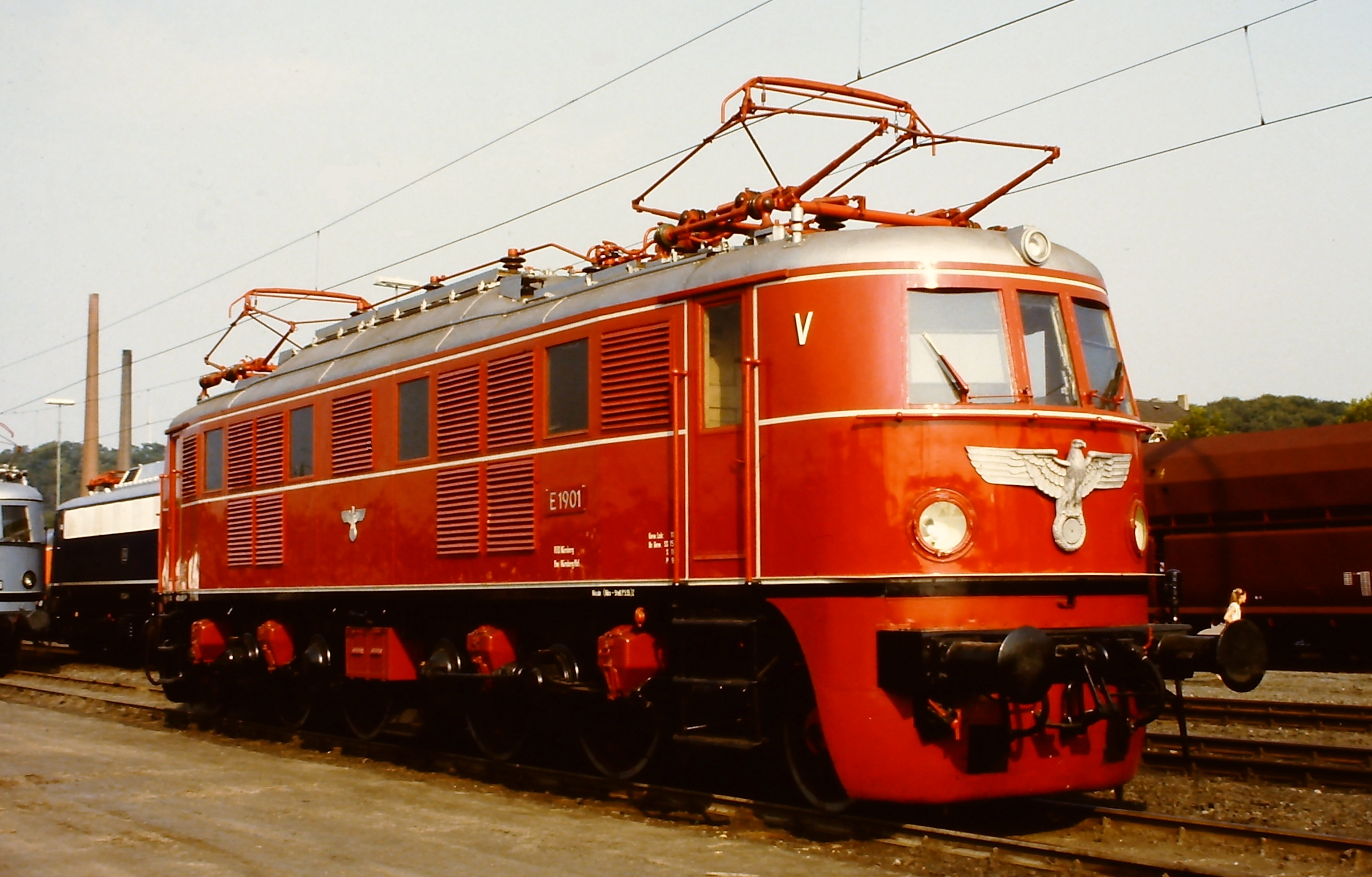
E 19 01 in red livery, 1985 Bochum-Dahlhausen

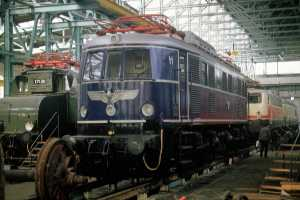
E 19 12 in blue livery, 1984

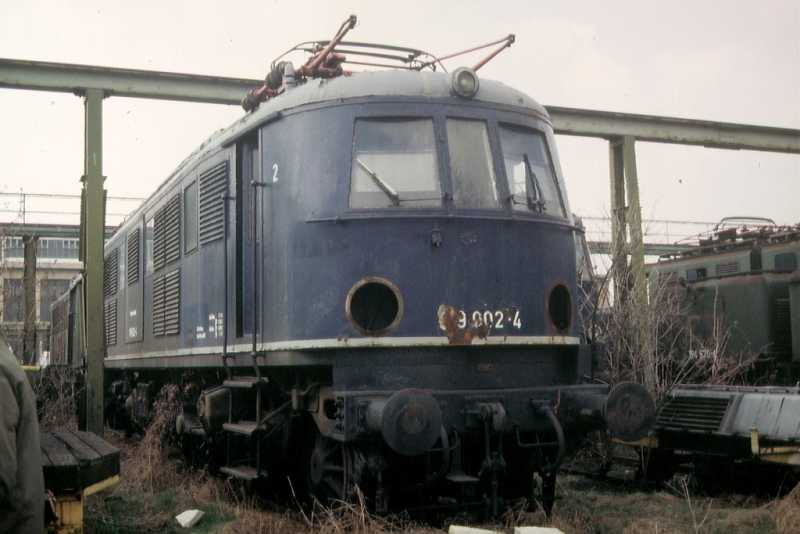
119 002 at the scrapyard in Munich, 1984
