= FS Class E.380 =

Class of 4 Italian electric locomotives

Class E.380
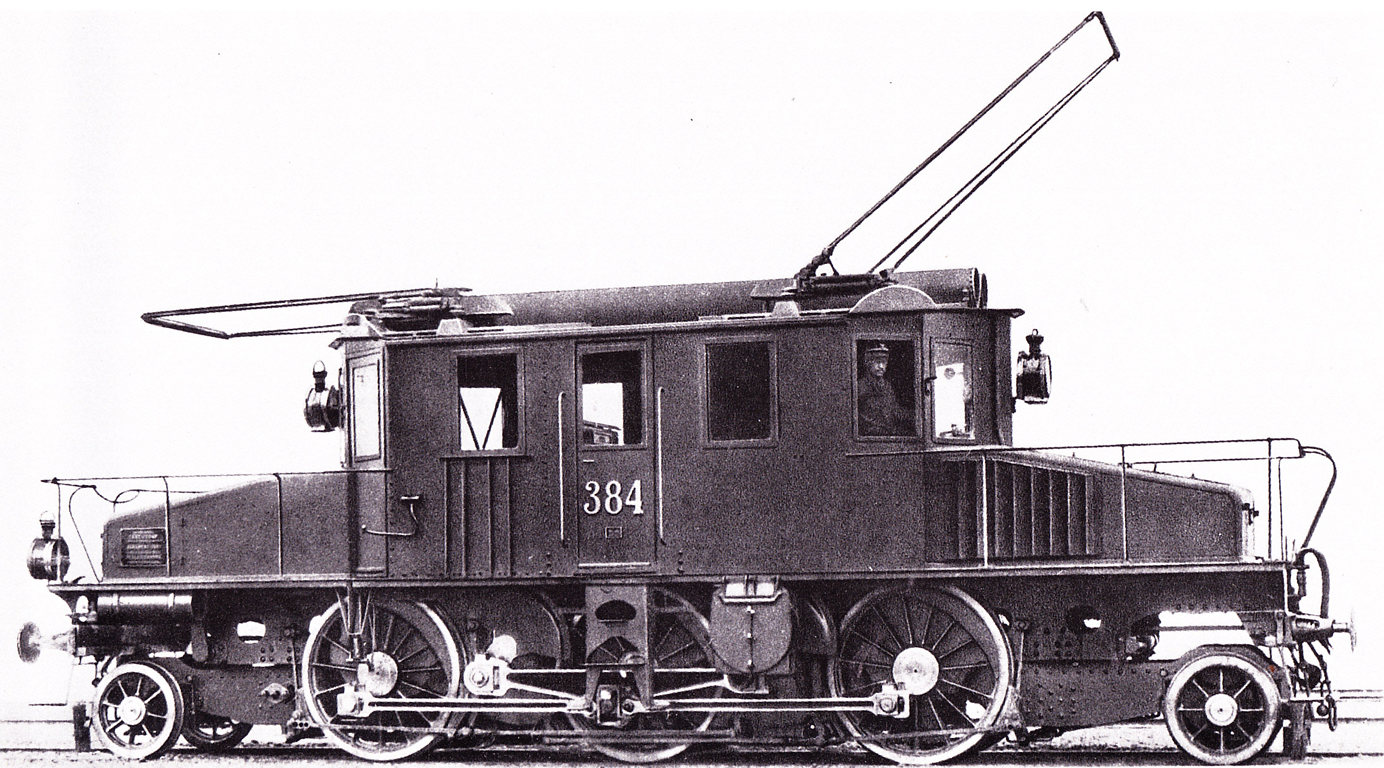
Type and origin
- Power type: electric
- Builder: Ganz
- Build date: 1905
- Total produced: 4
Specifications
- Configuration
  - AAR: 1-C-1
  - UIC: 1′C1′
- Gauge: 1,435 mm (4 ft 8 1/2 in) standard gauge
- Loco weight: 64.6 t (63.6 long tons; 71.2 short tons)
- Electric system/s: Three-phase 3.6 kV 16.7 Hz Catenary
- Current pickup: Bow collector
Performance figures
- Maximum speed: 71.2 km/h (44.2 mph)
- Power output: 1,250 kW (1,680 hp)
Career
- Operators: FS
- First run: 1906
- Retired: unknown

The FS Class E.380 was a small class of three-phase electric locomotive used in Italy, introduced in the 1900s.

== Overview ==
The locomotives, which entered in service in a small batch of 4 units, were characterized by a central cabin with two large hoods at each end. Built by Ganz, they had a similar mechanical equipment to the E.360 type. The E.380s showed a series of problems, so that two were refurbished as E.390.

== Technical details ==
The two fixed speeds were obtained by changing the motor connections. For high speed the motors were connected in parallel. For low speed the two motors were "cascaded" by connecting the rotor of one motor to the stator of the other. This caused both motors to run at half speed.

== Withdrawal ==
The low power output at the highest speed, and the limitation of use to only two fixed speeds (due to the control arrangement of the three-phase motors) led both classes to be retired after a short service period.
