= 1902 in rail transport =

This article lists events related to rail transport that occurred in 1902.

== Events ==
=== January events ===
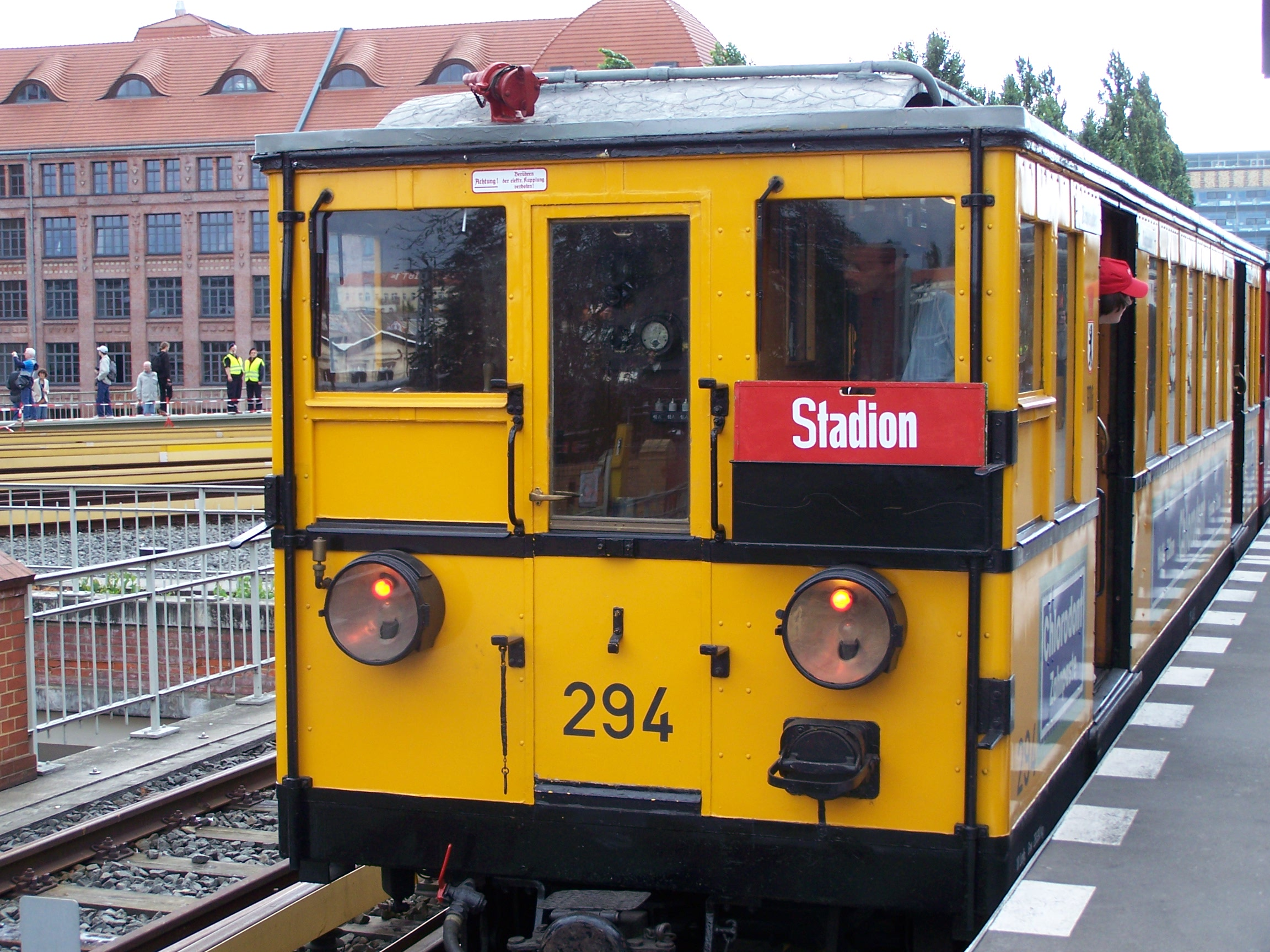
Berlin U-Bahn

- January 1 – The Swiss Federal Railways is formed through the merger and nationalization of several smaller railroads.
- January 8 – A train collision occurs in the New York Central Railroad's Park Avenue Tunnel in New York City killing 17 people, injuring 38 and leading to increased demand for electric trains.
- January 24 – The Thompson Tramway, a predecessor of the Connecticut Company, is renamed Worcester and Connecticut Eastern Railway.

=== February events ===
- February 13 – The Pennsylvania, New Jersey and New York Railroad, a predecessor of the Pennsylvania Tunnel and Terminal Railroad, is incorporated.
- February 15 – The Berlin U-Bahn Underground is opened in Germany.
- February – Great Western Railway of England turns out the prototype 'Saint' Class 4-6-0 locomotive from its Swindon Works, beginning a series of successful 2-cylinder designs.
- February – Edwin Winter becomes president of Brooklyn Rapid Transit in New York City.

=== March events ===
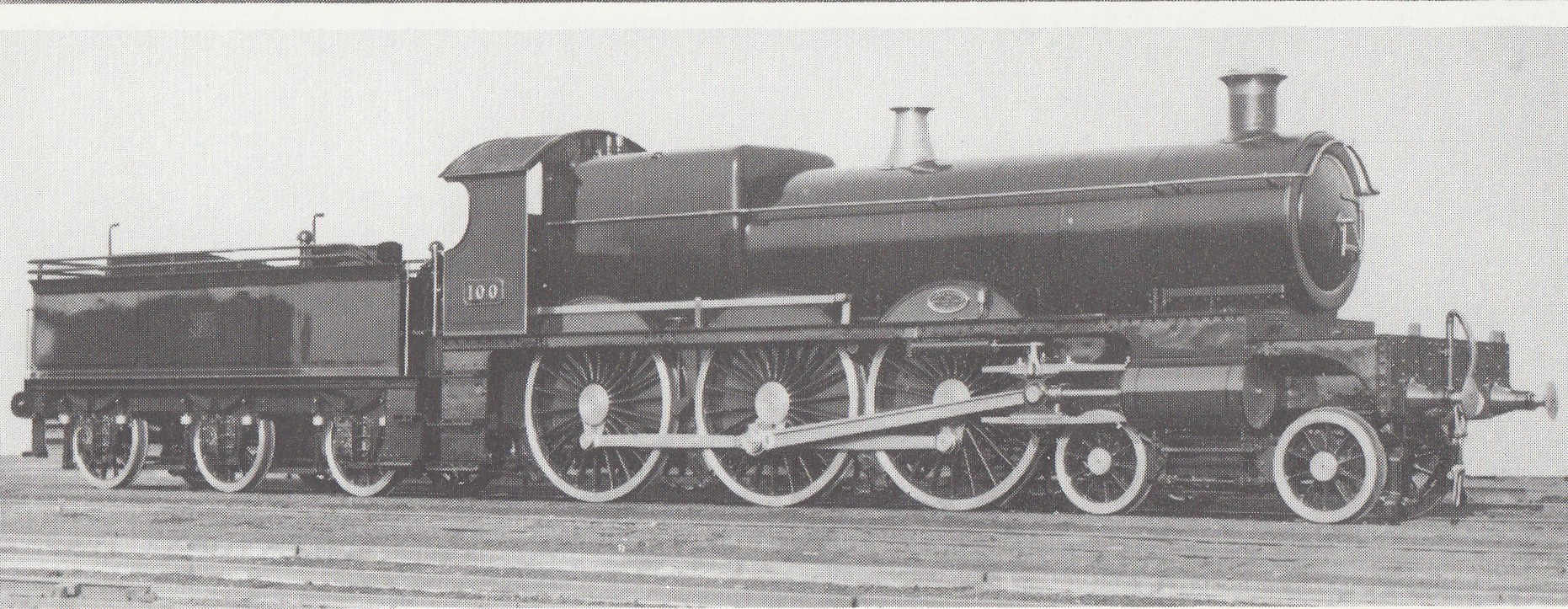
Great Western Railway 'Saint' Class prototype

- March 10 – An antitrust suit is filed against Northern Securities Company, a holding company controlling Northern Pacific Railway, Great Northern Railway, Chicago, Burlington and Quincy Railroad and others.

=== April events ===
- April 9 – Underground Electric Railways Company of London formed to consolidate the group of Underground lines controlled by American financier Charles Yerkes.
- April 21 – The Pennsylvania, New York and Long Island Railroad, a predecessor of the Pennsylvania Tunnel and Terminal Railroad, is incorporated.

=== May events ===
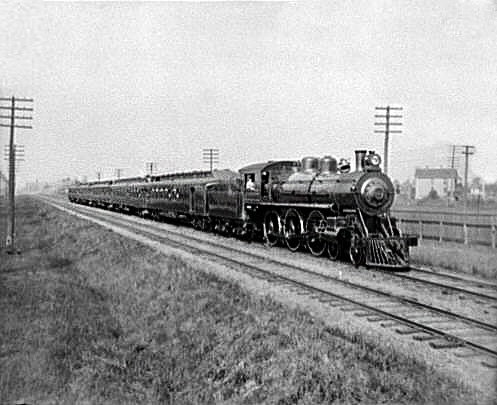
20th Century Limited

- May 1 – Ahead of merger documentation and filing, Canadian Pacific Railway takes control of the Ottawa, Northern and Western Railway.
- May 10 – Construction begins on the Temiskaming and Northern Ontario Railway.
- May 23 – Ottawa, Northern and Western Railway passenger trains are shifted to Ottawa's Broad Street Union Station.

=== June events ===
- June 11 – Chūō Main Line, Ochanomizu of Tokyo to Shiojiri route official complete in Japan, as same time, Shinjuku of Tokyo to Matsumoto route direct passenger train service start.
- June 15
  - The New York Central railroad debuts the 20th Century Limited passenger train between Chicago and New York.
  - Canadian Pacific Railway reroutes its transcontinental passenger trains in Ottawa to use the Vaudreuil line and the Interprovincial Bridge.

=== July events ===
- July 1 – Oliver Robert Hawke Bury becomes General Manager of the Great Northern Railway in England.
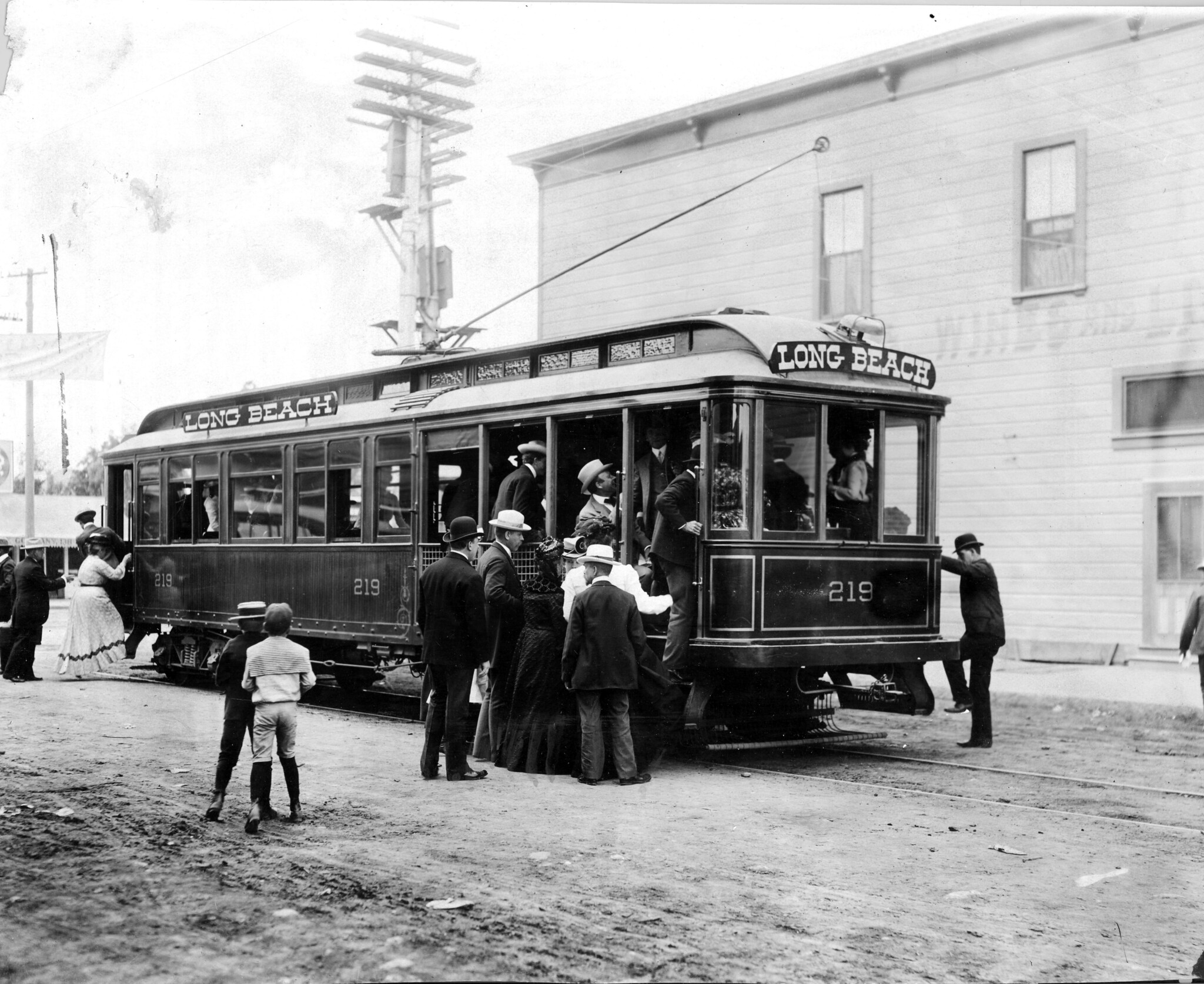
- Pacific Electric Railway passenger car number 219 on the first day of service from Los Angeles to Long Beach, California.
  July 4 – Pacific Electric Railway opens its first interurban line to connect Los Angeles and Long Beach, California.
- July 12 – First of the Neuquén-Cipolletti bridges opened for Buenos Aires Great Southern Railway traffic in Argentina.
- July 17 – The Texas Mexican Railway converts to standard gauge.
- July 31 – The Zillertal Railway opens in Austria.

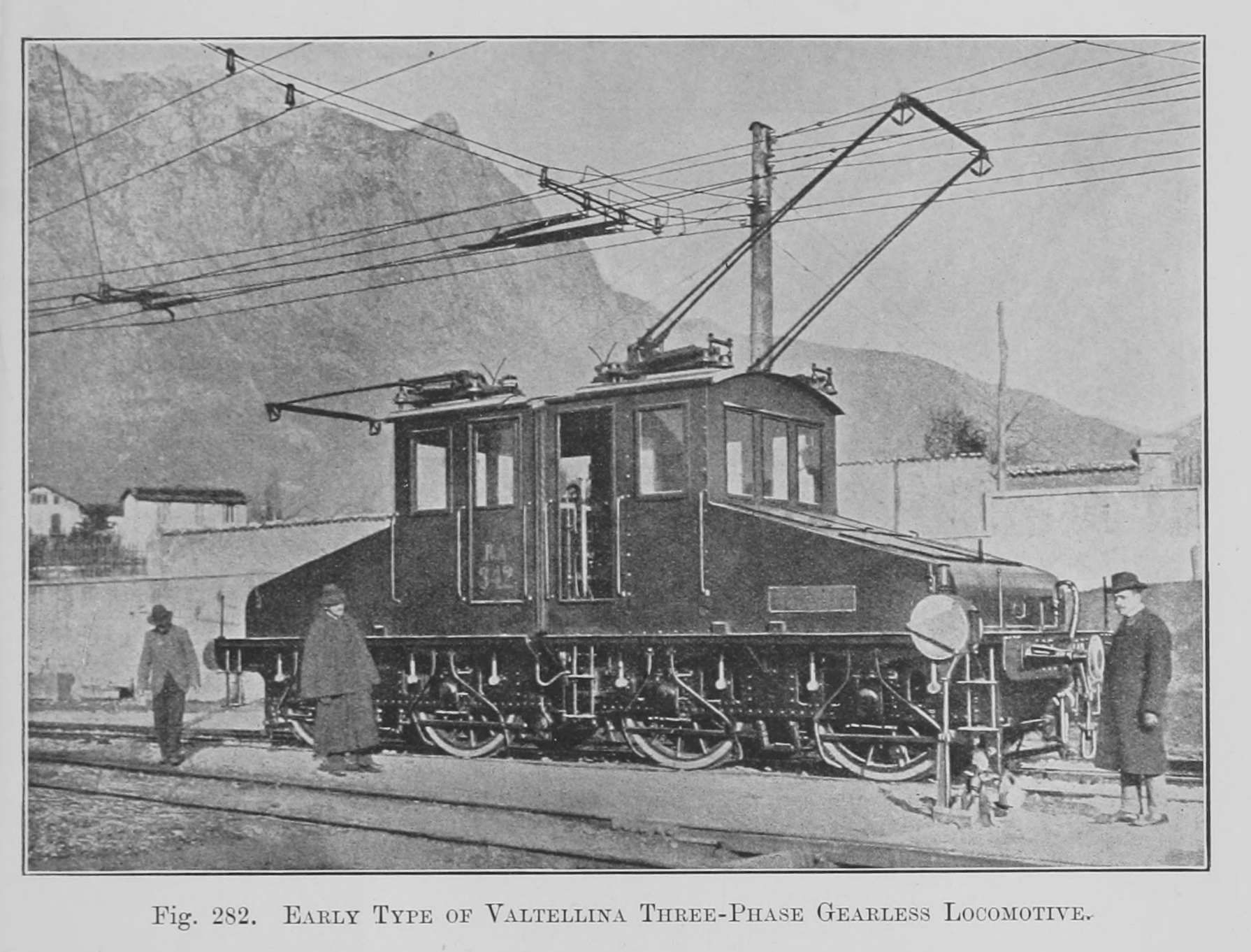
Ferrovia della Valtellina Class RA 34 3-phase AC electric locomotive

=== September events ===
- September 1 – Damascus–Daraa railway line completed.
- September 22 – Ottawa, Northern and Western Railway acquires the Pontiac and Pacific Junction Railway.

=== October events ===
- October 6 – The Basel–Dornach railway line opens in Switzerland.
- October 9 – The Trinity and Brazos Valley Railway, predecessor of the Burlington-Rock Island Railroad, is chartered in Texas.
- October 13 – Professor Ernest Rutherford of McGill University demonstrates the first wireless communication system between a station and a moving train using a Grand Trunk Railway passenger special operating between Toronto and Montreal.
- October 15 – The Ferrovia della Valtellina in Italy begins operating the world's first three-phase AC railway electrification system on a public standard gauge line, designed by MÁV chief engineer Kálmán Kandó with equipment by the Ganz Works.

=== November ===
- November 2 – Chicago, Rock Island and Pacific Railroad and Southern Pacific Railroad jointly inaugurate the Golden State Limited passenger train between Chicago, Illinois, and Los Angeles, California.
- November 26 – Skreiabanen in Toten, Norway, is opened.

=== Unknown date events ===
- The Alaska Central Railroad (an early predecessor of the Alaska Railroad) begins construction northward from Seward, Alaska.
- The Atlantic Coast Line acquires the Plant System Railroads and gains control of the Louisville & Nashville Railroad.
- Serious buffer stop accident at Frankfurt-am-Main inspires development of Rawie range of energy-absorbing buffer stops.
- Narrow gauge Ferrocarril de Córdoba a Huatusco is completed to Coscomatepec, Veracruz.
- Percy French writes the song Are Ye Right There Michael? ridiculing the West Clare Railway in Ireland.

== Deaths ==
=== May deaths ===
- May 20 – H. H. Hunnewell, director for Illinois Central Railroad 1862-1871, president of Kansas City, Fort Scott and Gulf Railroad, president of Kansas City, Lawrence and Southern Railroad, dies (b. 1810).

=== November deaths ===
- November 12 - William Henry Barlow, English railway civil engineer (born 1812).
