= FS Class E.330 =

Class of Italian electric locomotives

Class E.330
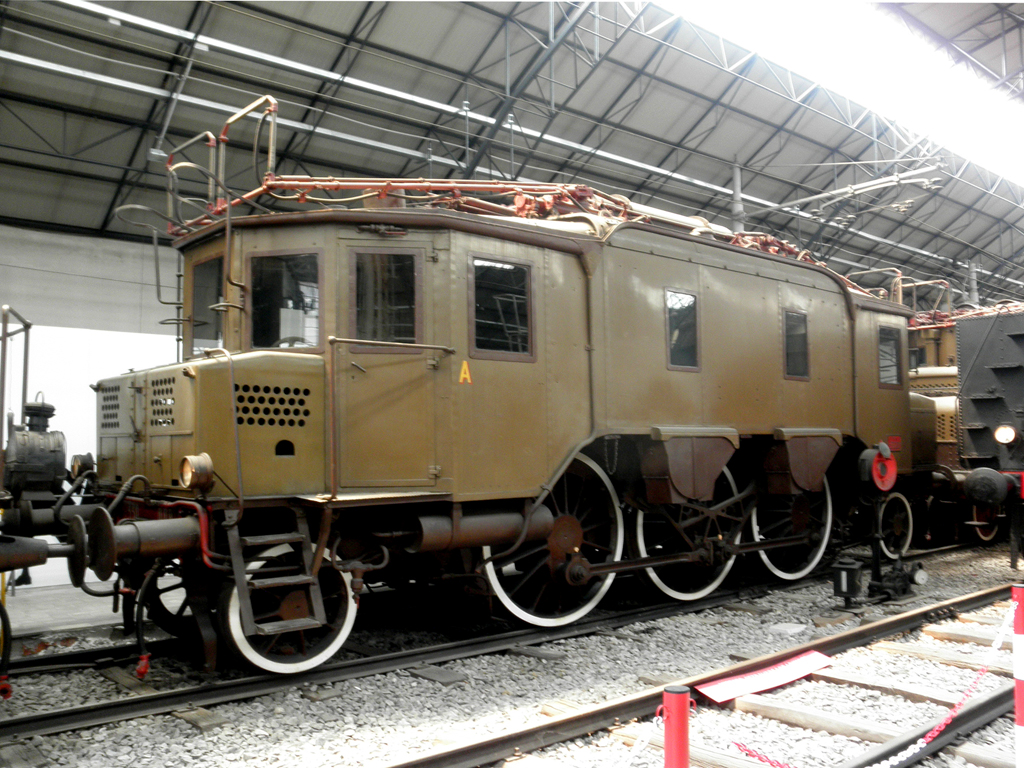
Type and origin
- Power type: electric
- Builder: Società Italiana Ernesto Breda and Società Italiana Westinghouse
- Build date: 1914
- Total produced: 16
Specifications
- Configuration
  - AAR: 1-C-1
  - UIC: 1′C1′
- Gauge: 1,435 mm (4 ft 8 1/2 in) standard gauge
- Driver dia.: 1,630 mm (64.17 in)
- Length: 11.008 m (36 ft 1 3/8 in)
- Adhesive weight: 51 t (50 long tons; 56 short tons)
- Loco weight: 73 t (72 long tons; 80 short tons)
- Electric system/s: Three-phase 3.6 kV 16.7 Hz Catenary
- Current pickup: Bow collector
Performance figures
- Maximum speed: 100 km/h (62 mph)
- Power output: 2,000 kW (2,700 hp)
- Tractive effort: 84 kN (19,000 lb_{f})
Career
- Operators: FS
- First run: 1914
- Retired: 1963

The FS Class E.330 was a small class of three-phase electric locomotive used in Italy, introduced in the 1910s.

== History ==
In the late 1900s, the success of the three-phase electrification on mountain lines such as the Valtellina line, the Simplon Tunnel and the Giovi Pass line, led the newly formed Ferrovie dello Stato, under the direction of Riccardo Bianchi, to extend the electrification to other lines, where electric locomotives gave better performance. For the new lines to be electrified, three batches of electric locomotives were ordered, including the E.330 and the E.550 (a type E.551 was ordered but not built).

Unlike the previous electric locomotives used on mountain lines, the new locomotives had to be able to vary their speed, a capability which at the time was difficult to achieve, due to the fact that the three-phase motor spins at constant speed set by the feeding current frequency. The E.330 was designed to have four speeds (where the E.430 had only one and the contemporary E.550 two); this capability was obtained thanks to two patents by the German engineer Manu Stern and the Hungarian engineer Maurice Milch. The wheel arrangement chosen was 1′C1′, similar to that adopted on the contemporary 685 class of steam locomotives.

The production contract was signed in 1913, construction of the new units beginning at Società Italiana Westinghouse, which had designed the locomotive under the direction of Kálmán Kandó. The mechanical parts were co-built with Società Italiana Ernesto Breda.

The locomotives were assigned to the Valtellina and Ligurian coast lines. The E.330s became operational in the Spring 1914. They were later used also in Lombardy on the local three-phase lines, until, from 1962, the railroads were adapted to the now standard 3,000 V direct current electrification.

All the E.330s were phased out during the 1960s.
