= FS Class E.360 =

Class of Italian electric locomotives

Class E.360
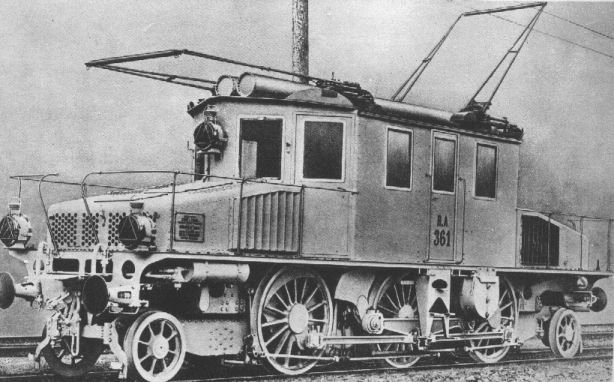
- Electric locomotive RA 361, later E.360
Type and origin
- Power type: electric
- Builder: Ganz Works
- Build date: 1905
- Total produced: 3
Specifications
- Configuration
  - Whyte: 2-6-2OE
  - AAR: 1-C-1
  - UIC: 1′C1′
- Gauge: 1,435 mm (4 ft 8 1/2 in) standard gauge
- Electric system/s: Three-phase overhead line
- Current pickup: Bow collector
Career
- Operators: Rete Adriatica; FS (after 1905); SBB (leased)
- Numbers: E.361-363

The FS Class E.360 were electric locomotives of the Italian State Railways (FS), using three-phase alternating current, built for the operation of the Valtellina line. They were ordered by Rete Adriatica (the Adriatic Network) and were originally numbered RA 361–363. Italian railways were nationalized in 1905 and they then became FS E.361-363 They were leased to Swiss Federal Railways (SBB) in 1906 and returned to Italy in 1907.

== Overview ==
The locomotives were built for the Valtellina Railway, a 106 km long line with many tunnels and curves. Hungarian engineer Kálmán Kandó electrified the line in the early 1900s using high voltage three-phase alternating current.

== Lease to SBB ==
The three locomotives were leased to the Swiss Federal Railways (SBB) between 1906 and 1907 for the purpose of operating in the Simplon tunnel. The testing of the Simplon line was carried out on 25 January 1906 by a train pulled by a steam locomotive. On the following 26 April, the first test with an electric locomotive was carried out. The choice of the three-phase system was made by Swiss railway technicians after the visits they made to the Italian lines of the Valtellina. The Swiss had no three-phase locomotives of their own at the time so they asked for, and obtained on hire from the newly constituted Italian State Railways, the three new locomotives E.361, 362 and 363. The locomotives gave excellent service on the Simplon line, hauling over 10 trains a day. The only problem was with the current collectors. The original Ganz collectors did not collect current reliably so they were replaced by Brown-Boveri collectors.

== Return to Italy ==
Locomotive E.363 returned to Valtellina in May 1907 and E.361 and E.362 respectively in October and November of the same year.

== See also ==
- RA 34, the original Bo+Bo 'gearless' locomotives supplied for the Valtellina line
