= FS Class E.331 =

Class E.331
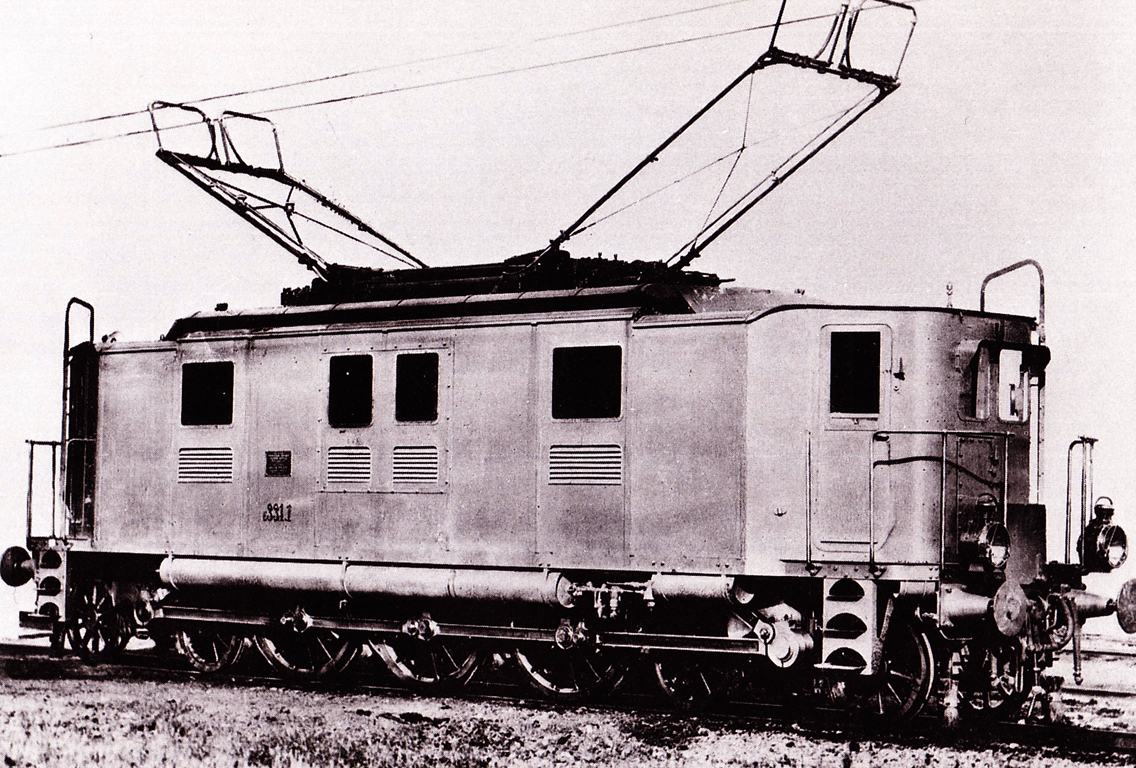
- Electric locomotive E.331.1 of the Italian State Railways
Type and origin
- Power type: electric
- Builder: Breda and Brown-Boveri
- Build date: 1914-1919
- Total produced: 18
Specifications
- Configuration
  - AAR: 2-C-2
  - UIC: 2′C2′
- Gauge: 1,435 mm (4 ft 8 1/2 in) standard gauge
- Leading dia.: 960 mm (38 in)
- Driver dia.: 1,630 mm (64 in)
- Trailing dia.: 960 mm (38 in)
- Loco weight: 92 tonnes (91 long tons; 101 short tons)
- Electric system/s: Three-phase overhead line 3.6 kV, 16.7 Hz
Performance figures
- Maximum speed: 100 km/h (62 mph)
- Power output: 2,000 kW (2,700 hp)
Career
- Operators: FS

FS Class E.331 was a class of three-phase electric locomotives of the Italian State Railways. Eighteen of these 2′C2′ locomotives were built between 1914 and 1919 by Breda and Brown-Boveri.

== Overview ==
Eighteen of these locomotives were built by Breda, with electrical parts by Brown-Boveri, between 1914 and 1919. The class had the same pole-changing system as the E.330 which allowed an increase in the number of economic speeds to four. Until a few years earlier, only two speeds could be obtained with the arrangement of cascade or parallel traction motor connections. In the E.331, a further two economic speeds could be obtained by changing the number of poles on the traction motors. One of the limitations of the machine, and the source of numerous failures, was the type of rotary switch used to vary the number of poles. Current was picked up from the two-wire overhead line by two pantographs, both continuously in use. The locomotive was built on a rigid frame, with three coupled axles driven by two jackshafts connected to the motors by inclined connecting rods. The front and rear bogies had smaller diameter wheels, as was usual for the locomotives of the time.

== Service ==
Class E.331 locomotives were used between Turin and Bussoleno, on the Frejus line. The 2′C2′ machines, with 100 km/h (62 mph) maximum speed and power of about 2,000 kW (2,700 hp), were at their ease, especially on the flat or on gentle gradients.
