= FS Class E.550 =

Locomotive class

Coordinates: 38.571572°N 90.462048°W

Class E.550
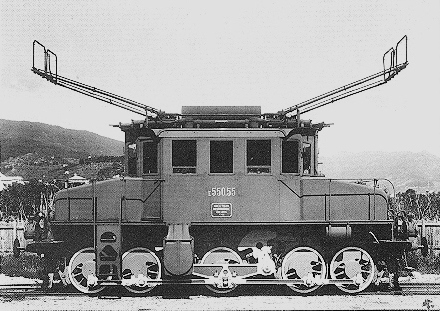
Type and origin
- Power type: Electric
- Builder: Società Italiana Westinghouse
- Model: 1906
- Build date: 1908-1921
- Total produced: 186
Specifications
- Configuration
  - Whyte: 0-10-0OE
  - AAR: E
  - UIC: E
- Gauge: 1,435 mm (4 ft 8 1/2 in) standard gauge
- Length: 9.5 m (31 ft 2 in)
- Loco weight: 63 t (62 long tons; 69 short tons)
- Electric system/s: Three-phase 3,400 V 15.8 Hz Catenary
- Current pickup: Bow collector
Performance figures
- Maximum speed: 50 km/h (31 mph)
- Power output: 1,500 kW (2,000 hp)
Career
- Operators: FS
- Retired: 1965

The FS Class E.550 was a class of three-phase electric locomotive used in Italy, introduced in the 20th century, which remained in service until 1965.

== History ==
In the wake of the success met by three-phase electric locomotives on the Valtellina line, in the early 20th century the newly formed state-owned Ferrovie dello Stato, led by Riccardo Bianchi, decided to electrify the important mountain line of the Giovi Pass as well, which connected the port of Genoa to the industrial cities of northern Italy. The decision was taken because the line was close to full saturation despite the use of the powerful 470 class steam locomotives. Electrification of the line at 3,400V, 15.8 Hz was completed in 1916.

The designer of the electric part was Hungarian engineer Kálmán Kandó. The whole project, initially developed by the FS central design studio, was later completed by the Società Italiana Westinghouse of Vado Ligure. The first E.550 prototype proved capable of hauling trains of up to 400 t (390 long tons; 440 short tons) at 50 km/h (31 mph) on the steep hill stretches of the Giovi railroad. In comparison, a pair of Class 470 steam locomotives were only capable of 310 t or 310 long tons or 340 short tons at half that speed. The use of electric traction solved the problem of smoke dissipation in the tunnels as well. A total of 186 E.550s were built between 1908 and 1921, in four series.

== Description ==
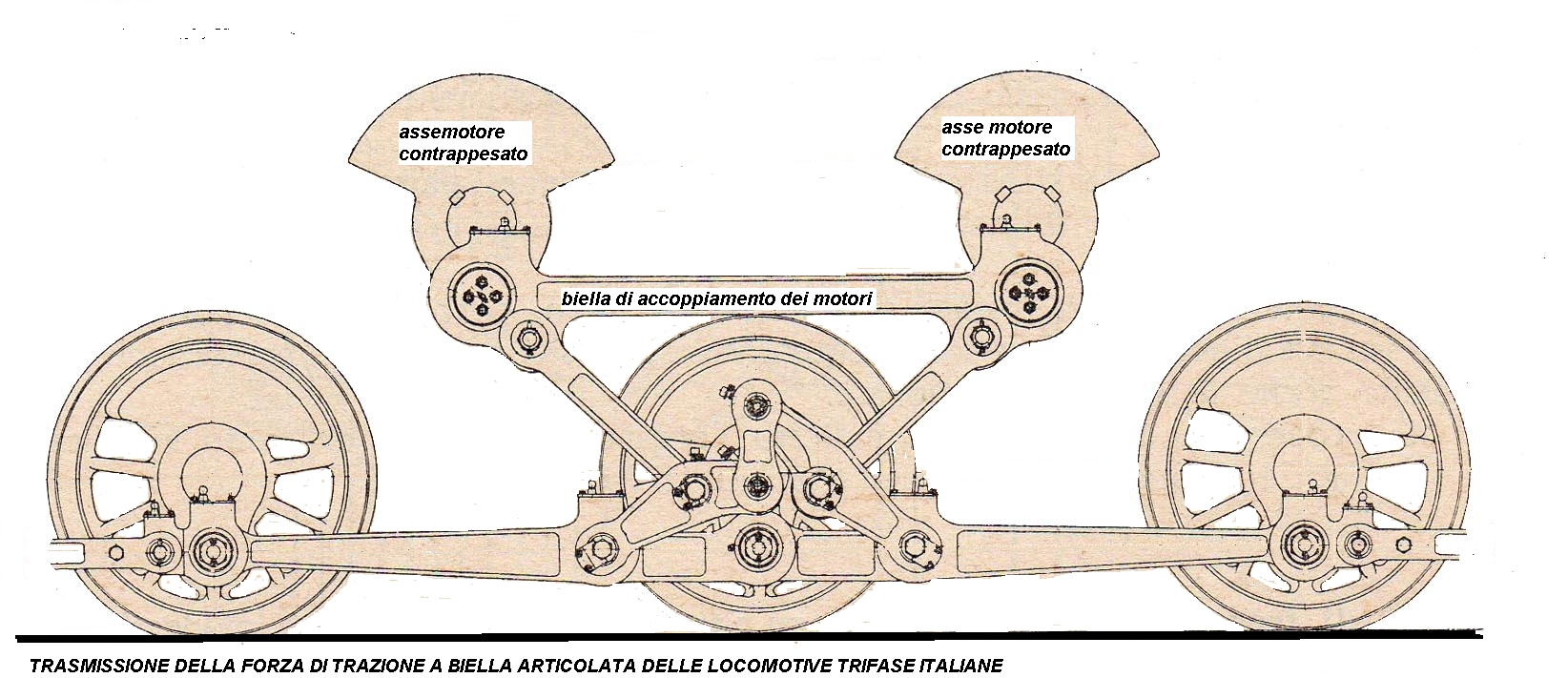
Diagram of triangle drive on Class E.554

E.550 had five axles connected to the two electric motors through an articulated coupling rod. The three center axles were rigidly mounted to the frame and the center axle's wheels were without flanges. The outer axles were mounted in a manner that allowed them to turn into curves. The wheels were small, and thus adapted to heavy freight or slow passenger services at low speed. The locomotive had two cabs, one at each end of the central compartment. The motors were asynchronous three-phase, which could be connected in series at low speed and in parallel at higher speeds. The connections were enabled through a drum switch using a liquid-cooled rheostat. Feeding was provided by paired trolley poles at each end, each pair carrying two bow collectors for the two wires of the three phase system.

Braking was provided by an automatic continuous brake and a regulated, hand-operated brake.

== Developments ==
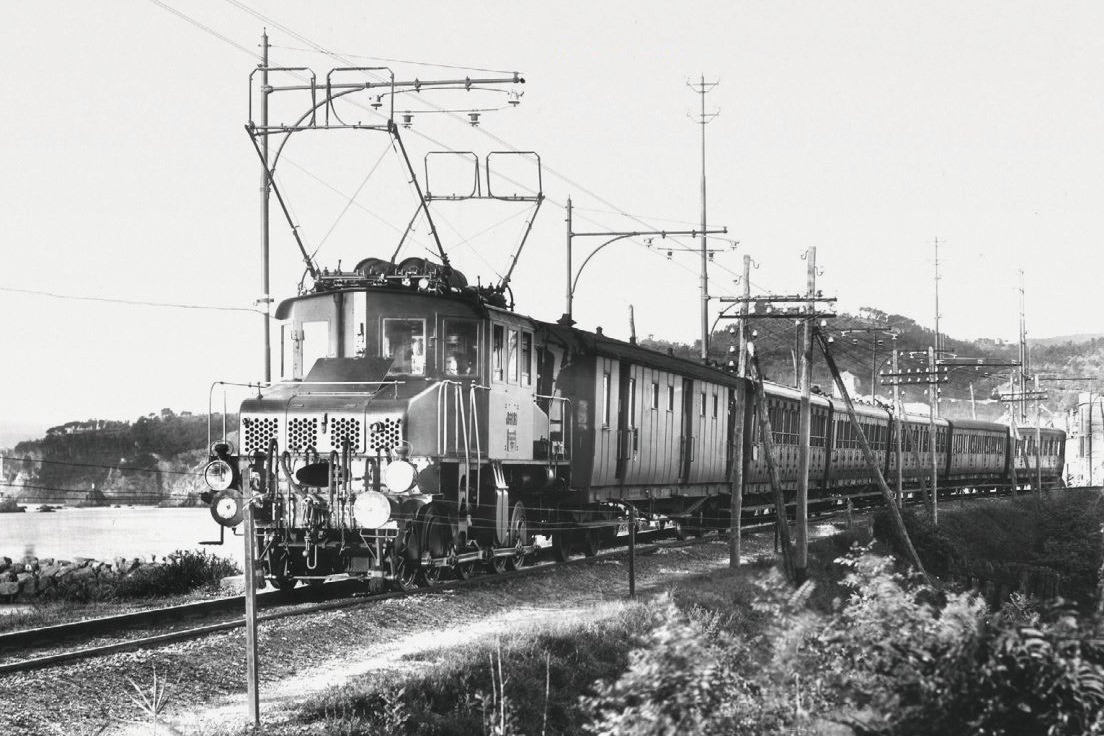
At Albisola on the Genoa-Savona line

The locomotives of classes E.551, E.552 and E.554 were all developments of E.550. Some E.550s units were later transformed into snow-sweepers.

== Transformations and reutilization ==
In 1953, locomotive E.550.023 was modified at Bolzano to add a large snow plow to one end. It served on the Brenner line from 1955 to 1965.

In 1955, locomotives E.550.086 and E.550.115 were demotorized and transformed into push-type snow plows; they received the classification Vnx 201 and 202. Between 1963 and 1966 additional units were transformed in the same fashion to become Vnx 210–222. Sometime thereafter, snow plow equipped E.550.023 was also demotorized.

At some point, the Vnx were renumbered into the series Vnx 806.210-222. Some have since been renumbered into the 12-digit UIC scheme in the series 40 83 970 6 0xx-x.

== Preservation ==
E.550.025 is at the National Museum of Transportation in St. Louis, Missouri, in poor cosmetic condition due to being stored outside since 1968. It is awaiting transfer to Savigliano (CN), Italy, in the exhibition of the Piedmont Railway Museum. There is an ongoing fundraiser for its transfer by sea.

E.550.030 is at the Museo Nazionale Scienza e Tecnologia Leonardo da Vinci in Milan, Italy.
