= FS Class E.430 =

Class of Italian electric locomotives

E.430
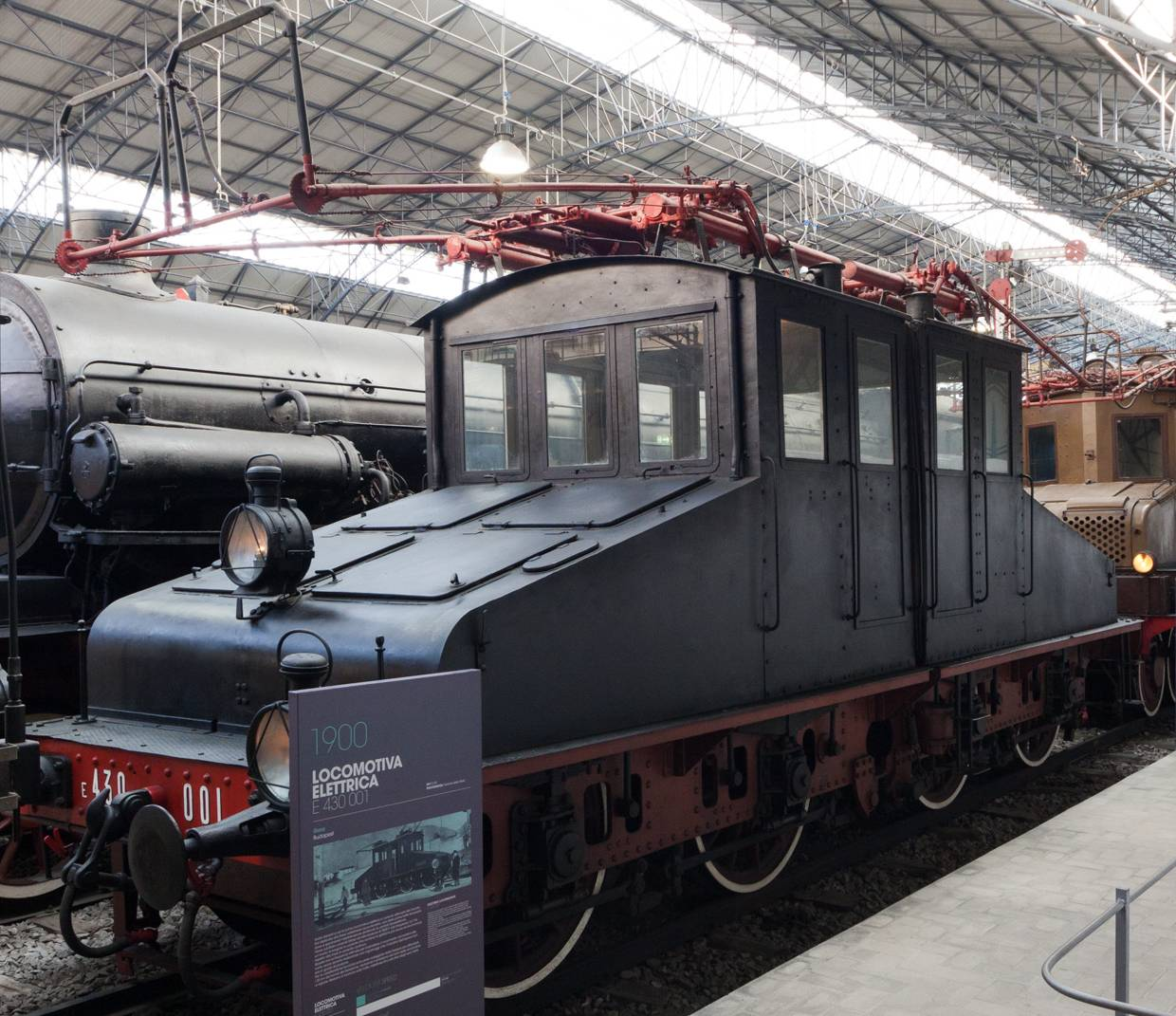
- E.430.1 preserved at the Museo Nazionale Scienza e Tecnologia Leonardo da Vinci in Milan
Type and origin
- Power type: Electric
- Builder: Ganz Works
- Build date: 1901
- Total produced: 2
Specifications
- Configuration
  - UIC: Bo+Bo
- Gauge: 1,435 mm (4 ft 8 1/2 in)
- Wheel diameter: 1,500 mm (59 in)
- Wheelbase: 4,630 mm (182 in)
  - Axle spacing (Asymmetrical): 2,000 mm (79 in)
- Length
  - Over couplers: 10,300 mm (410 in)
- Power supply: 3,000 V three-phase 15-16.7 Hz AC
- Current pickup: 2× bow collectors
- Traction motors: 4× 150 hp (110 kW)
- Transmission: direct
Career
- Operators: Ferrovia della Valtellina
- Numbers: 34.1, 34.2; 0341, 0342; E.430.1, E.430.2
- First run: 1902
- Preserved: 1

The FS Class E.430 locomotives, initially classed as RA 34, were three-phase alternating current electric locomotives of the Italian railways. They were built for Ferrovia della Valtellina by Ganz and MÁVAG in 1901 and had a power output of 440 kW (about 600 metric horsepower) and a haulage capacity of 300 tons. One locomotive is preserved.

== History ==
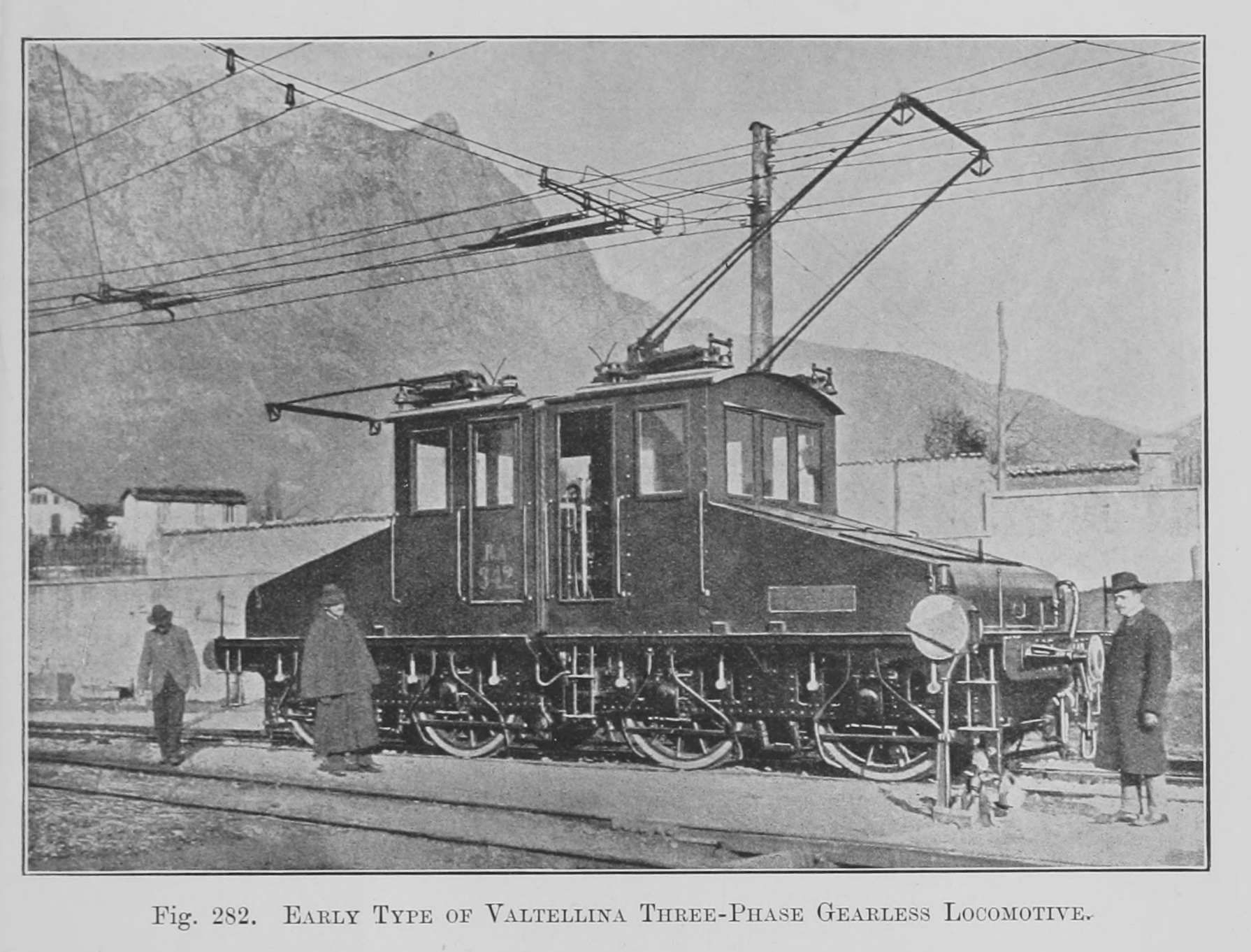
Early Type of Valtellina Three-Phase Gearless Locomotive, 1907

Class E.430 is the first example, worldwide, of an electric locomotive powered by three-phase current. It was built for Rete Adriatica (the Adriatic Network), which at that time operated the Ferrovia della Valtellina, by Ganz Works, for the electrical part, and by the Royal Hungarian State Machine Factory (MÁVAG), for the mechanical part. These were, at the time, the most advanced factories in the world in the electric railway sector. The locomotives were numbered 34.1 and 34.2 under the management of the Adriatic Network. Acquired in 1905 by the Ferrovie dello Stato, the numbering changed to 0341-0342 and in 1914 they were re-numbered E.430.1 and E.430.2.

Since the Valtellina lines were the first in Italy to use three-phase electric power for the haulage of trains, the E.430 was used from the beginning. The Adriatic Network had commissioned the entire electrification project from the Ganz company in Budapest. The equipment was built under the supervision of Kálmán Kandó, one of the pioneers of three-phase traction in Italy. The electrification work began in 1897, with the establishment of a government commission to experiment with different electrification systems: one with accumulators (Bologna - San Felice and Milan - Monza lines), one with direct current at 650 V from a third rail (Milan - Varese), and finally the three-phase system on the Valtellina line.

The tests of the electric power lines at 3,000 - 3,300 Volt, at frequency 15 - 16.7 Hz, powered by the Campovico hydroelectric plant were carried out between 26 July 1902 and 4 September 1902, while tests on the Lecco - Colico - Chiavenna and Colico - Sondrio lines officially began on 15 October 1902. The passenger service was entrusted to a fleet of 10 electric railcars belonging to Class RA 32, while the freight was entrusted to the two locomotives of Class RA 34 numbered 34.1 and 34.2 (later E.430 FS).

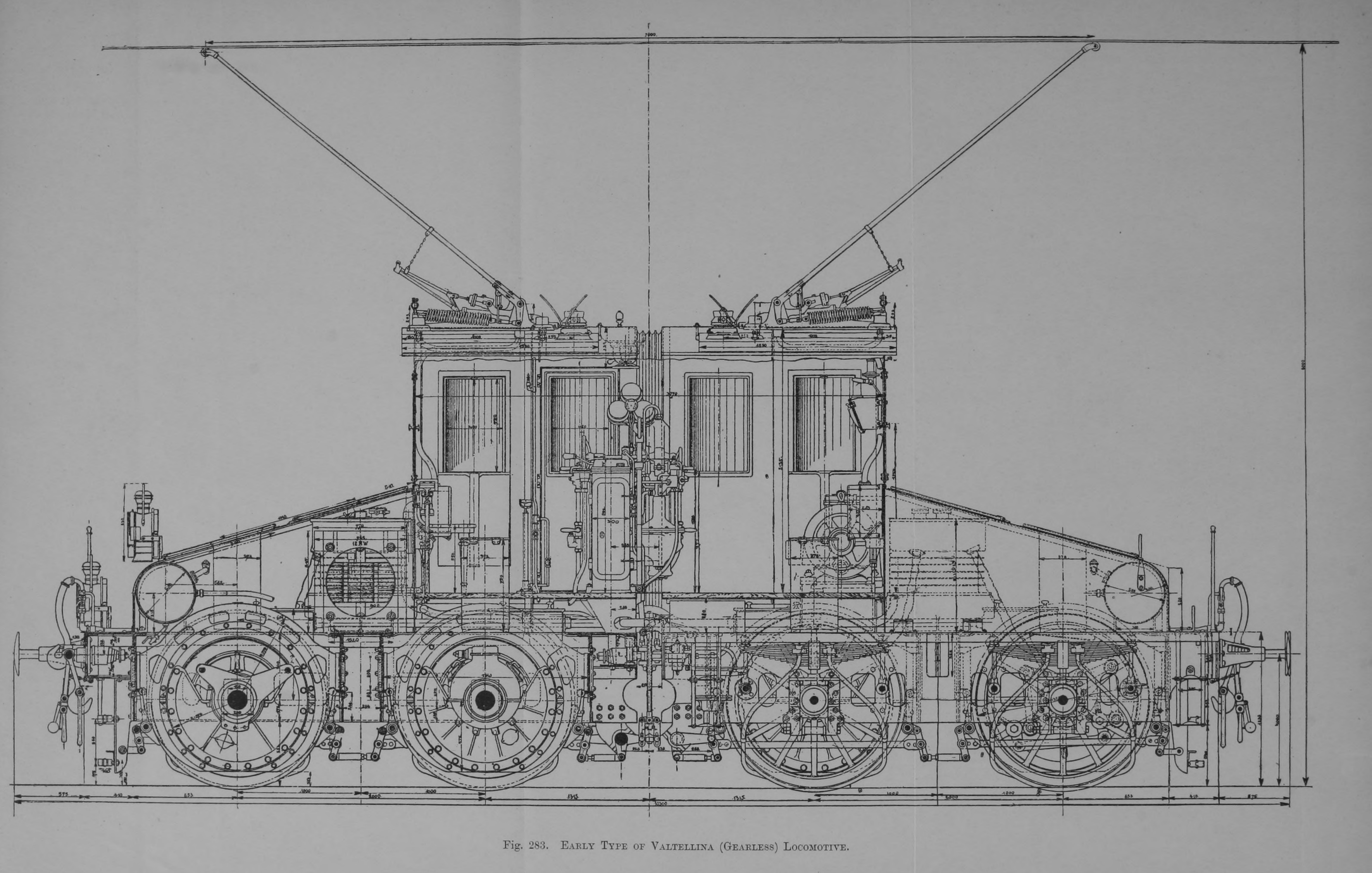
Engineering cross section

The electric locomotives, built by Ganz and Mavag in 1901 and with a power of 440 kW and a haulage capacity of 300 tons, easily out-performed the steam locomotives of the time. The electric railcars, on the other hand, proved insufficient for hauling passenger trains and, subsequently de-motored, they were transformed into passenger coaches of Class RBz.

From 1928 the locomotives were removed from the Valtellina line and transferred to the stations at Bolzano and Fortezza where, from 1929, they were used as shunting locomotives to assemble trains of wagons in transit towards the Brenner Pass.

== Technical details ==
The design of the locomotive was unusual. It comprised two half-locomotives coupled back-to-back with a bellows joint in the middle of the cab. This gave the wheel arrangement of Bo+Bo, rather than the more common Bo-Bo bogie system in later years. Front and rear visibility was ensured by three glass panels and there were four more on each side. Windshield wipers and washers were not provided. Each half-locomotive had two axles with leaf springs.

The four 150-horsepower traction motors were mounted coaxially on the axles, with a bellcrank linkage to the wheels, similar to that also used for the Valtellina electric railcars. The wheels and motors were covered by sloping bonnets, each equipped with four doors to allow maintenance. Current collection was by two bow collectors, controlled by groups of four cylindrical springs each.

== Brief history of the Valtellina lines ==
- Colico - Sondrio: inaugurated 16 June 1885, electrified 1901-1902
- Colico - Chiavenna: inaugurated 9 September 1886, electrified 1901-1902
- Lecco - Bellano: inaugurated 1 July 1892, electrified 1901-1902
- Bellano - Colico: inaugurated 1 August 1894, electrified 1901-1902
- Sondrio - Tirano: inaugurated 29 June 1902, electrified after World War I

== Preservation ==
E.430.001 is in the Museo Nazionale Scienza e Tecnologia Leonardo da Vinci in Milan. This is the unit once in service at Fortezza station. It is displayed in its later condition with modified current collectors and three large headlights.

== See also ==
- RA 361–363 the 1904 locomotives of the Valtellina line
