= Ferrovia della Valtellina =

Railway line in Lombardy, Italy

Valtellina railway
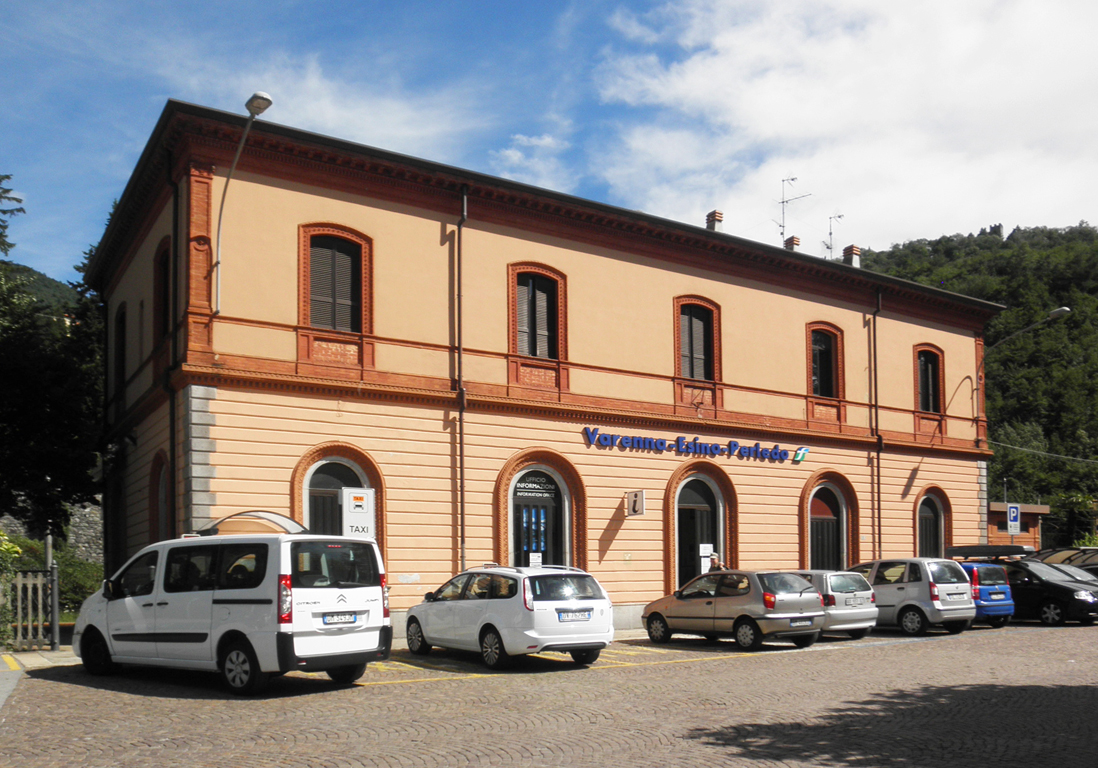
- Varenna railway station

Overview
- Status: Operational
- Locale: Italy (Sondrio)
- Termini: Sondrio; Lecco
- Stations: 20

Service
- System: Ferrovie dello Stato (FS)
- Operator(s): Ferrovie dello Stato

History
- Opened: 1885-1894

Technical
- Number of tracks: Single track
- Track gauge: 1,435 mm (4 ft 8 1/2 in) standard gauge
- Electrification: Electrified at 3000 V DC

The Ferrovia della Valtellina (Valtellina railway) is a railway line in Italy that runs from Lecco to Valtellina and Valchiavenna. It was opened in 1894 and electrified on the three-phase system in 1902. It is now electrified at 3 kV direct current and operated by Trenord.

== History ==
The line was built in stages between 1885 and 1894. Two large railway companies dominated the area at the time. They were the Rete Adriatica (Adriatic network) and the Rete Mediterranea (Mediterranean network). With the opening of the Colico-Bellano section, on 1 August 1894 a complete railway service started.

=== Electrification ===
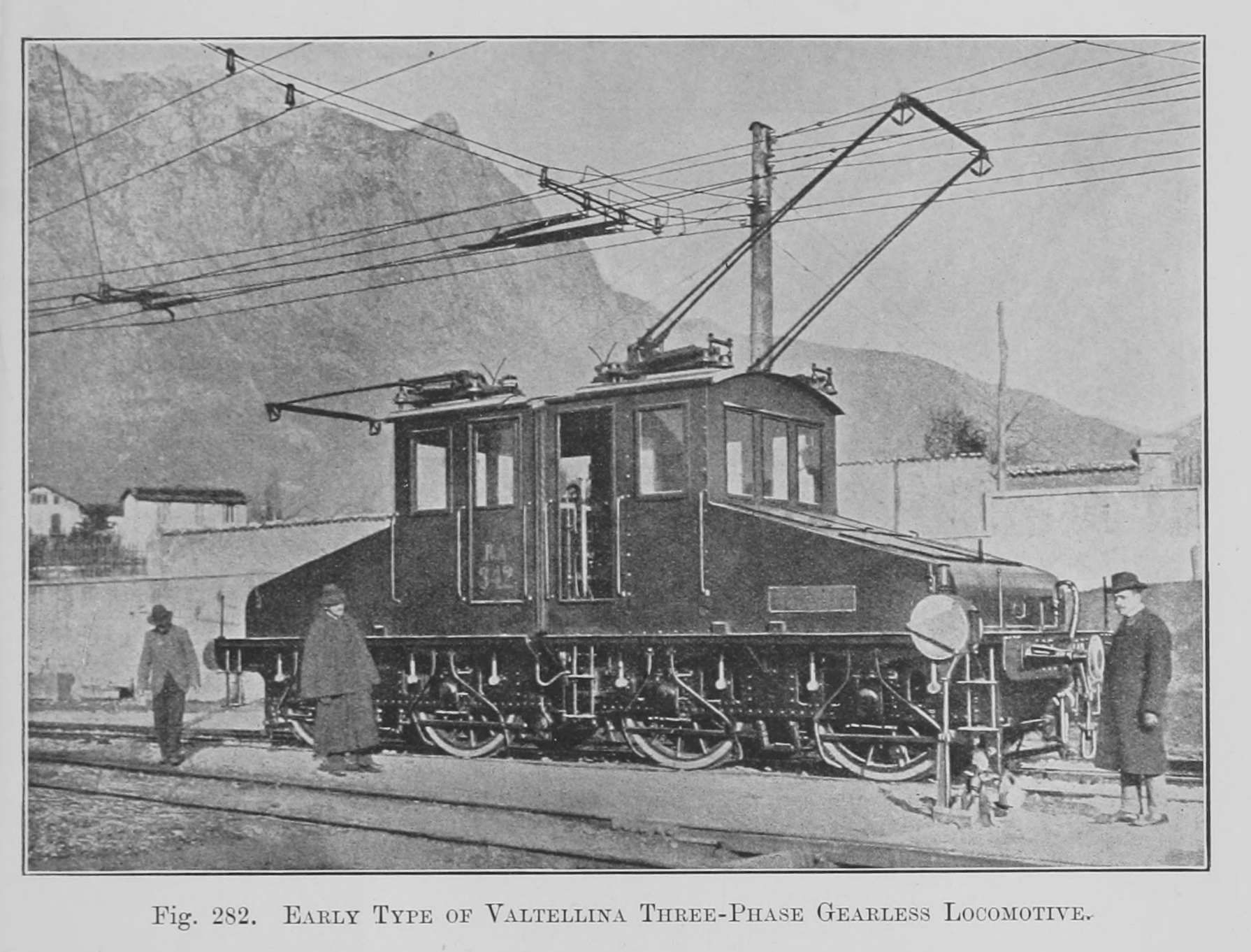
RA 34, later FS Class E.430

The Valtellina railway is notable for being an early user of electric traction. It was the first in Italy and the first in the world to use high-voltage three-phase alternating current for rail traction.

In 1897, Hungarian engineer Kálmán Kandó designed an electric system and engines for the Italian railways, the electric traction system had great advantages and importance on the very steep railway tracks in the mountainous regions of Italy. Under his leadership the Ganz factory began work on three-phase haulage for railways. Based on their design, the Italian Ferrovia della Valtellina was electrified in 1902 and became Europe's first electrified main line railway.

On 15 October 1902 the electrification began on the Lecco-Colico-Chiavenna and Colico-Sondrio sections with overhead power lines at 3,000 V, 15 Hz. The frequency was later raised to 15.8 Hz for reasons unknown. Finally, the voltage and frequency were raised to 3,600 V, 16.7 Hz, which became an Italian standard. Power was supplied by the Campovico hydroelectric plant.

The line is now electrified with 3 kV direct current.

== The route ==
The line was built with great technical daring but the Lecco-Colico-Chiavenna section now shows its age. Over the 40 kilometres to Colico there are 89 curves, 18 viaducts and 19 tunnels. However, the line, which runs along the eastern shore of Lake Como with its jagged coastline, offers passengers enchanting views of inlets in which can be seen patrician villas, lush vegetation and lake marinas.

Tirano station is an interchange point for travellers who want to go to Switzerland on the Rhaetian Railway, a narrow-gauge line, departing from the aforementioned station that follows a route that reaches 2,253 metres in height and the famous tourist station St. Moritz.

== Traffic ==
The line is used by regional trains of Trenord which run along the Sondrio-Lecco and Sondrio-Tirano routes (stopping at all stations), and from Regio Express trains - until 2007 called Diretti - of Trenord, many of which travel the entire Tirano route to Milan Central.

From December 2014, on public holidays and the month of August the Regional trains of Lecco-Sondrio terminate at Colico and are replaced by buses for the remaining section.

== Rolling stock ==
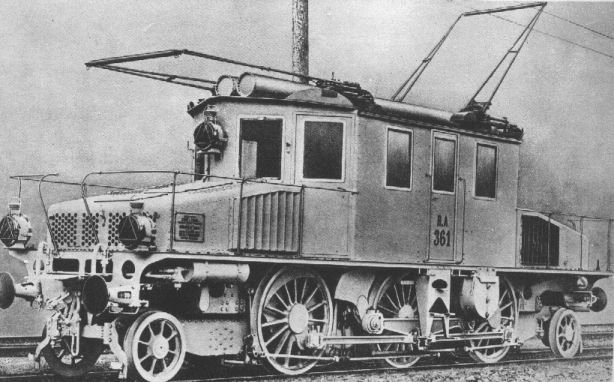
RA 361, later FS Class E.360

=== Historical ===
Initially the rolling stock used, with three-phase alternating current, consisted of:

- RA 34, later, FS Class E.430, Bo+Bo locomotive
- RA 361, later FS Class E.360, 1′C1′ locomotive
- Railcars FS E.1 and E.2

=== Recent ===
More recently, compositions have been used, between Milan and Tirano, of an FS Class E.464 electric locomotive with 7 MDVC carriages [Carrozze_FS_tipo_MDVC] and MDVC pilot, while the festive trains consist of FS Class ALe 803 electric multiple units or E.464 locomotives and low-floor carriages. Sometimes FS Class ALe 582 or, rarely, compositions of FS Class ALn 668 diesel railcars are used. From 2015 on the Milano Centrale-Tirano route, ETR 425 trainsets are used.

== See also ==
- Lecco–Milan railway
- Tirano–Lecco railway
