= Bo+Bo =

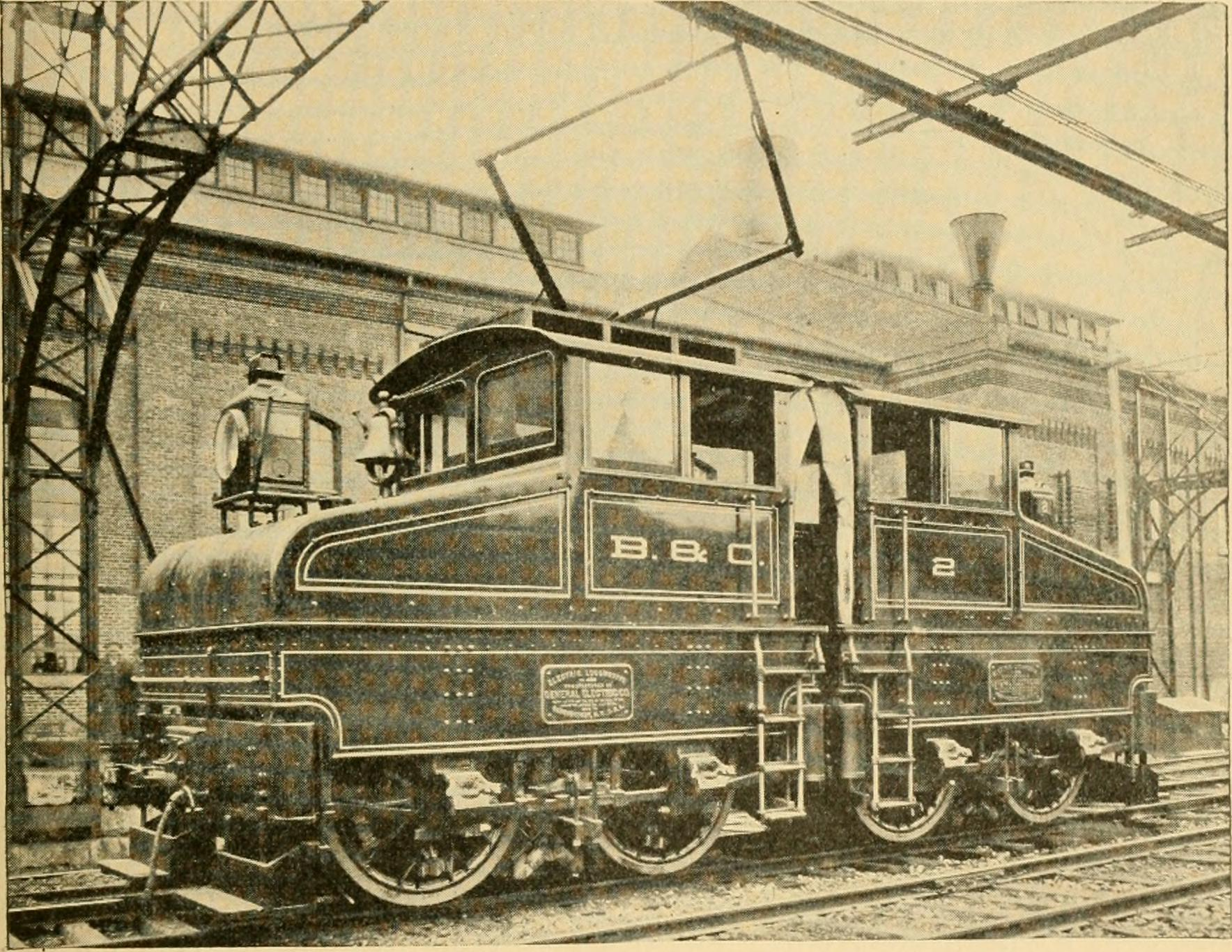
Baltimore and Ohio LE-1 steeple cab in 1899

A Bo+Bo wheel arrangement is an electric locomotive, with two four-wheeled chassis or bogies with an articulated connection between them, with the drawbar forces taken through these bogies, and with all axles powered by individual traction motors.

This is in contrast to the more common Bo-Bo arrangement where the two bogies are mounted beneath a shared frame, and the forces are taken through that frame.

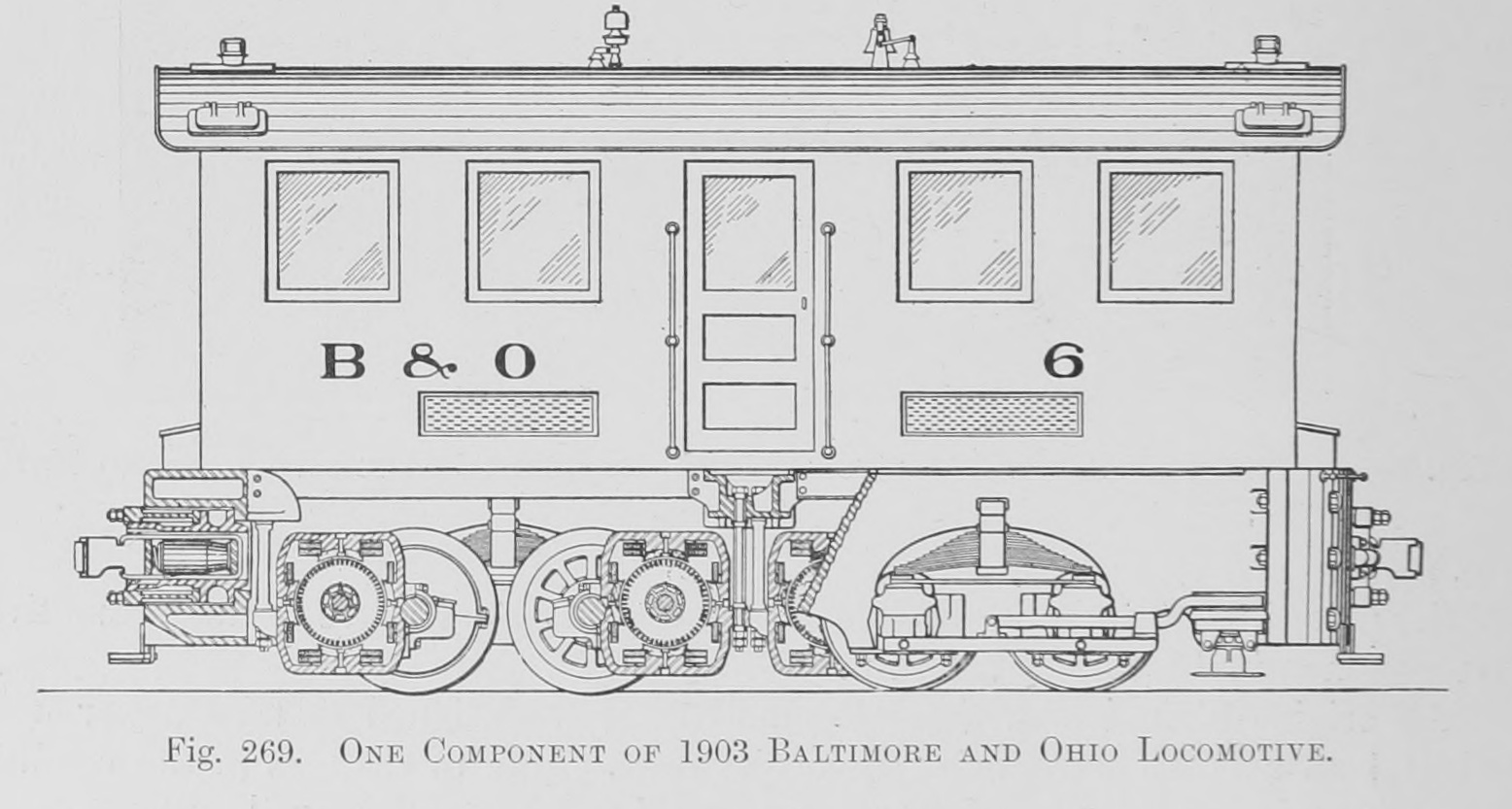
Partial sectioned drawing of a small boxcab Baltimore and Ohio LE-2 of 1903, showing the connection between bogies and drawbar

The type was important for early electric locomotives such as the first Baltimore and Ohio LE-1 in 1899 or the Italian E.430 of 1901. These had two separate chassis and half-cabs, linked by a pin connector. A canvas dodger joined the gap between the cabs.

Later designs resembled the Bo-Bo layout, where a single large boxcab spanned the two bogies and was pivoted upon them. As these pivots did not carry the tractive force, they could be of simple design.

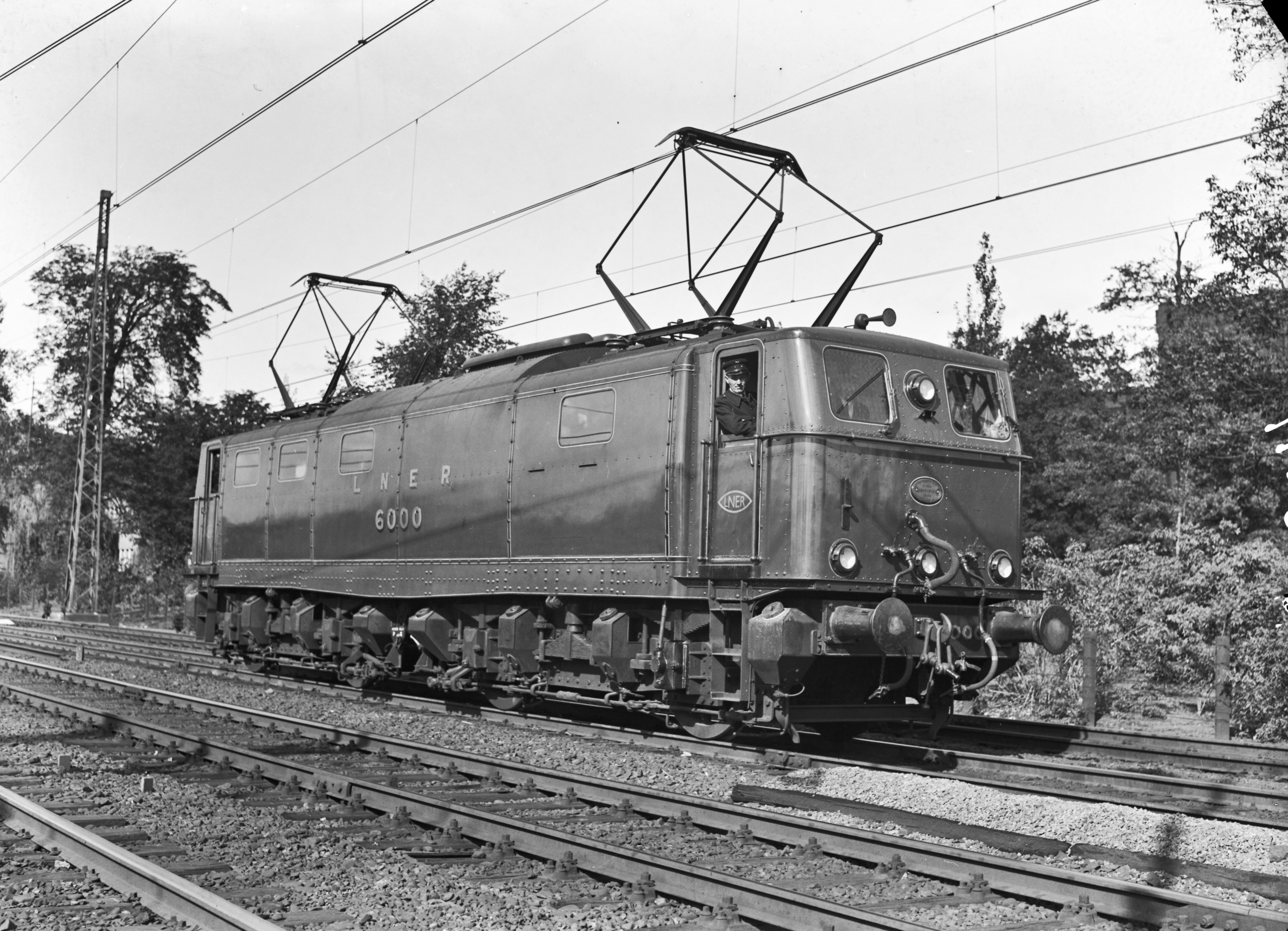
LNER 6000, the prototype of the British Railways class 76, while on hire to the Dutch national railways in 1947

Typical mid-century Bo+Bo locomotives include the South African Class 1E and Class 2E or the Japanese National Railways JNR ED17. Railways using Cape gauge such as the South African or Japanese narrow gauge systems with long locomotives found Bo+Bo advantageous over Bo-Bo as there was less overhang of the couplers and so less sideways misalignment on tight curves.

== (Bo′Bo′)(Bo′Bo′) ==
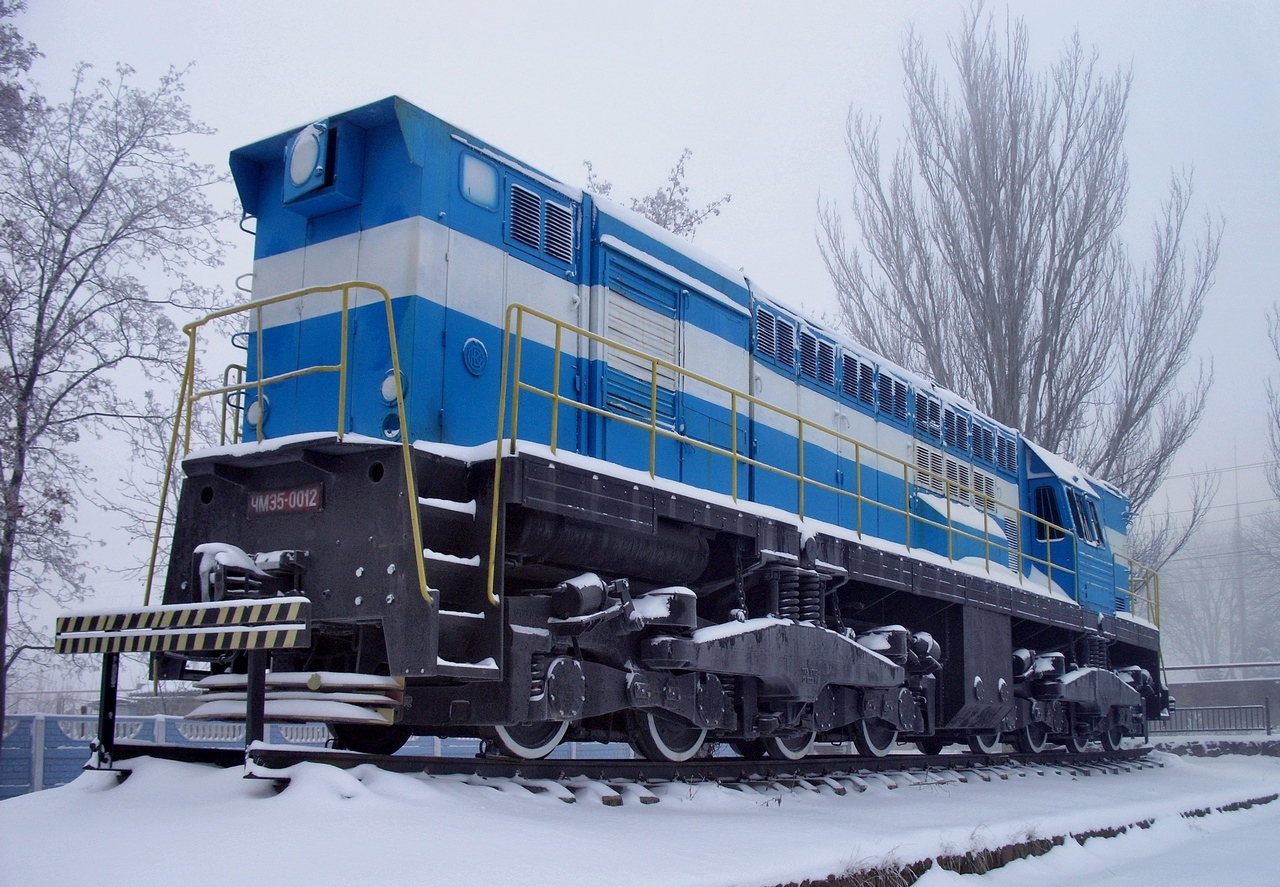
ChME5 and the four-axled articulated bogie

In the 1980s an extension of the Bo+Bo concept was used by ČKD Praha in Czechoslovakia for the ChME5, a small class of a dozen large switching locomotives for the Donets Railway. Although of modest power, 2,000 hp (1,500 kW), they were heavy and also geared for a high tractive effort at low speeds; so they required good traction. Rather than more conventional three-axled bogies for a Co-Co arrangement, a four-axled bogie was required. This would have been an excessively long wheelbase and so hard on track curves. A solution was to articulate the bogie itself, making each bogie a Bo+Bo chassis.

The earlier Soviet ТЭМ7 and the high-speed TEP80 had already used a (Bo′Bo′)(Bo′Bo′) layout with sub-bogies. The ChME5 repeated this, and retained the large span bolsters and flexicoil-style secondary suspension of the ТЭМ7. For the ChME5 though, the vertical forces were taken through the over-bogie frames, but the tractive effort were taken by coupling the sub-bogies as a Bo+Bo.
