= Kálmán Kandó =

Hungarian engineer and inventor of phase converter (1869-1931)

Noble Kálmán Kandó de Egerfarmos et Sztregov
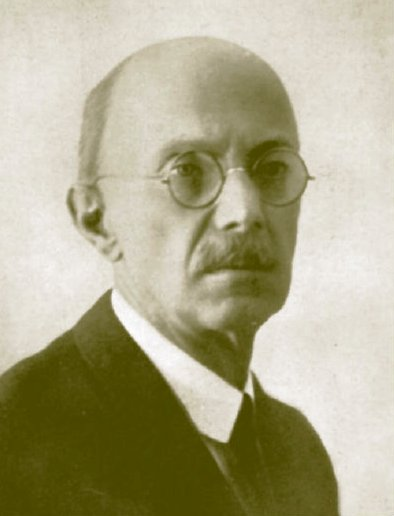
- Born: July 10, 1869; Pest, Kingdom of Hungary
- Died: January 13, 1931 (aged 61); Budapest, Kingdom of Hungary
- Education: Budapest Technical University
- Occupation: engineer

Kálmán Kandó de Egerfarmos et Sztregova (egerfarmosi és sztregovai Kandó Kálmán; July 10, 1869 – January 13, 1931) was a Hungarian engineer, the inventor of phase converter and a pioneer in the development of AC electric railway traction.

== Education and family ==
Kálmán Kandó was born on July 8, 1869, in Pest into an ancient Hungarian noble family. His father was Géza Kandó (1840-1906) and his mother was Irma Gulácsy (1845-1933). He began his grammar school studies at the Budapest Lutheran High School in Sütő street. His parents transferred him from a crowded school to a smaller school, a practice grammar school founded by Mór Kármán. He enrolled in Budapest Technical University where he received a degree in mechanical engineering in 1892. Kandó served as a volunteer in the Austro-Hungarian Navy until 1893.

He married Ilona Mária Petronella Posch (1880-1913) in Terézváros on February 2, 1899. Their first child, also named Kálmán was born in the winter of 1899, and their daughter Ilona Sára was born in 1901. On July 9, 1913, his wife died of renal failure in Rozsnyó. His son Kálmán became a military officer. On October 18, 1922, his son Kálmán committed suicide with a service pistol (under unclear circumstances) in a military barrack. His daughter Ilona Mária was married on July 7, 1923, and his grandson, George (also an engineer), was born on June 5, 1924.

== Work on railway electrification ==
=== France ===
After his military service, he traveled to France in the autumn of 1893, and worked for the Fives-Lille Company as a junior engineer, where he designed and developed early induction motors for locomotives. For the manufacture of induction motors, he developed a completely new design-calculation procedure, which made it possible to produce economical AC traction motors for the Fives Lille Company. Kandó designed more suitable 3-phase asynchronous electric drive motors instead of the less effective synchronous electric motors of earlier locomotive designs. Within a year, Kandó was appointed as the chief engineer of the electric motor development at the French firm. András Mechwart (the Ganz and Co.’s managing director at that time) asked him to return to Hungary in 1894 and invited him to work at the electrical engineering department of the Ganz Works.

=== Ganz Company, Budapest ===
In 1894, Kálmán Kandó developed high-voltage three phase alternating current motors and generators for electric locomotives; he is known as the father of the electric train. His work on railway electrification was done at the Ganz electric works in Budapest. Kandó's early 1894 designs were first applied in a short three-phase AC tramway in Evian-les-Bains (France), which was constructed between 1896 and 1898. It was driven by 37 HP asynchronous traction system.

In 1907, he moved with his family to Vado Ligure in Italy and obtained employment with Società Italiana Westinghouse. He would later return to Budapest to work at the Ganz factory where he became the managing director.

=== Italy, Designing the World's first electrified main railway line ===
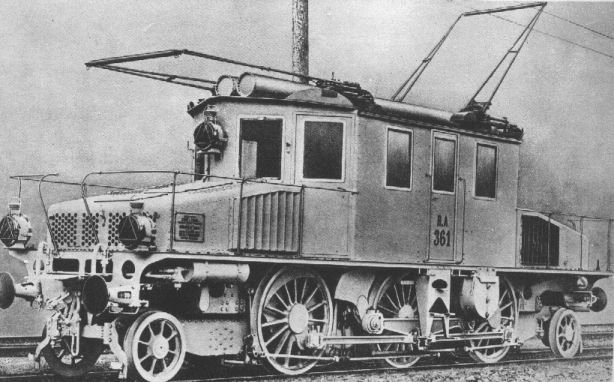
Electric locomotive RA 361 (later FS Class E.360) by Ganz for the Valtellina line, 1904

In 1897, Kandó designed an electric system and engines for the Italian railways, the electric traction system had great advantages and importance on the very steep railway tracks in the mountainous regions of Italy. Under his leadership, the Ganz factory began work on three-phase haulage for railways. Based on their design, the Italian Ferrovia della Valtellina was electrified in 1902 and became Europe's first electrified main line railway.

For the Valtellina line, three-phase power was supplied at 3,000 volts (later increased to 3,600 volts) through two overhead lines, while the running rails supplied the third phase. At junctions, the two overhead lines had to cross and this prevented the use of very high voltages.

The three-phase, two wire, system was used on several railways in Northern Italy and became known as "the Italian system". There are now few railways which use this system.

In 1907, the Italian government decided for the electrification of another 2000-km railway line with the restriction that the electrical equipment and rolling stock could only be manufactured in Italy. The Westinghouse Company bought up Kandó's patents and paid a license-fee for the electric motors of the Ganz factory. The Westinghouse Company also built a locomotive factory in Vado Ligure, and appointed Kandó to head the new factory. Kandó accepted the invitation and moved to Vado in Italy with his several Hungarian colleagues. Two types of locomotives were developed with his leadership in Italy: a 1500 kw cinquanta and a 2100 kw trenta electric locomotives, from which altogether some 700 units were produced. More than 540 of these were still in service in 1945.

In honour of Kandó’s work, he was awarded with Commendatore dell'Ordine della Corona d'Italia (Commander of the Order of the Crown of Italy), but in 1915 he had to flee through Switzerland, since Italy entered World War I on the Entente side and declared war on the Austro-Hungarian Monarchy.

=== Electrification of the London underground lines ===
On the District and Metropolitan Railways, the use of steam locomotives led to smoke-filled stations and carriages that were unpopular with passengers and by the early twentieth century electrification was seen as the way forward. A tender was announced for an electric system, and the largest European and American companies applied to win the tender. However, when the experts of the railways compared the designs from the Ganz Works to the offers of the other large European and American competitors, they concluded that Ganz Works' technology was cheaper and more reliable and described its technology as a "revolution in electric railway traction". In 1901, a metropolitan and district joint committee recommended the Ganz three-phase AC system with overhead wires. Initially, this was unanimously accepted by both parties, until the district found an investor, the American Charles Yerkes, to finance the upgrade. Yerkes raised £1 million (1901 pounds adjusted by inflation are £106 million) and soon had control of the District Railway. However Yerkes favoured the classic DC system, similar to that in use on the City & South London Railway and Central London Railway. The Metropolitan Railway protested about the change of plan, but after arbitration by the Board of Trade the DC system was adopted.

=== Vienna, invention of the phase converter ===
During World War I, between 1916 and 1917, Kandó was a lieutenant completing military service for the Ministry of Defence in Vienna. He worked out a revolutionary system of phase-changing electrical hauling, whereby locomotives were powered by the standard, 50-period, single-phase alternating current used in the national energy supply system. He was the first who recognised that an electric train system can only be successful if it can use the electricity from public networks. In 1918, Kandó invented and developed the rotary phase converter, enabling electric locomotives to use three-phase motors whilst supplied via a single overhead wire, carrying the simple industrial frequency (50 Hz) single phase AC of the high voltage national networks.

=== Hungary ===
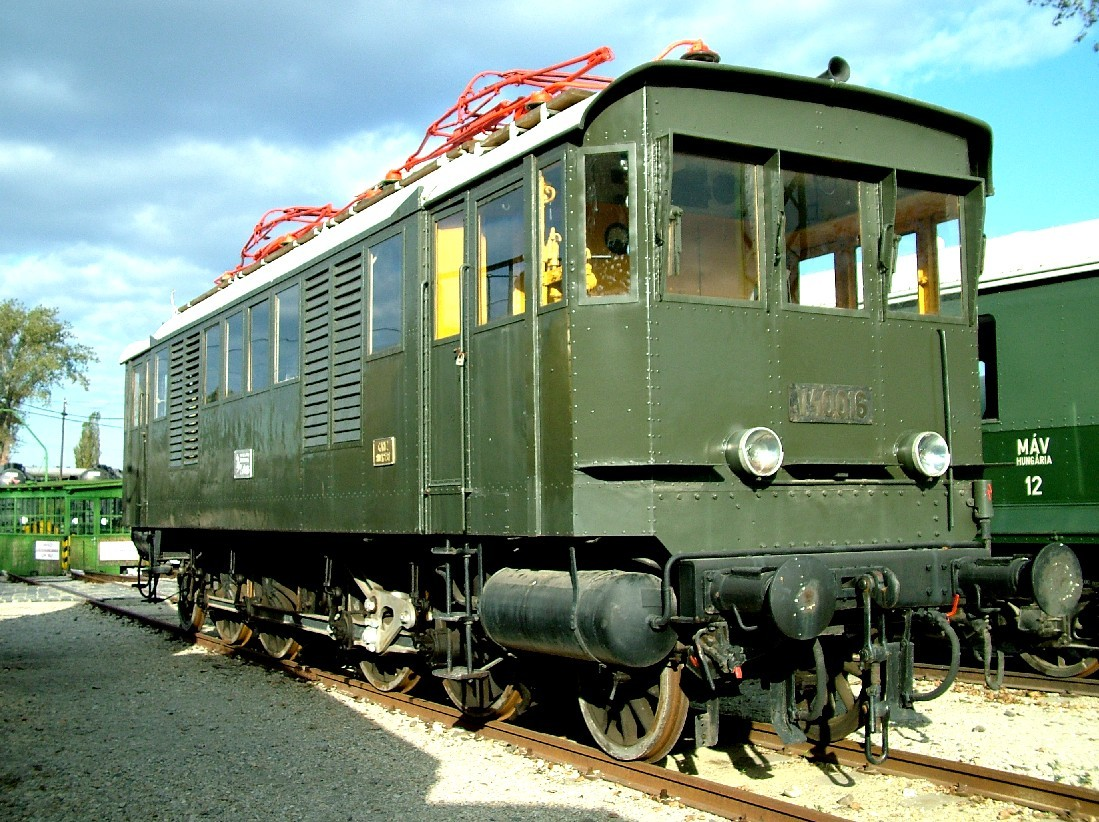
Kandó V40 electric locomotive of MÁV

To avoid the problems associated with the use of two overhead wires, Kandó developed a modified system for use in Hungary. His V40 series phase-shifting locomotives were intended for passenger and express train service. Power semiconductors not having been invented yet in the 1930s, the Kandó V40 locomotives' systems relied on electromechanics and electrochemistry.

==== Kandó synchronous phase converter ====
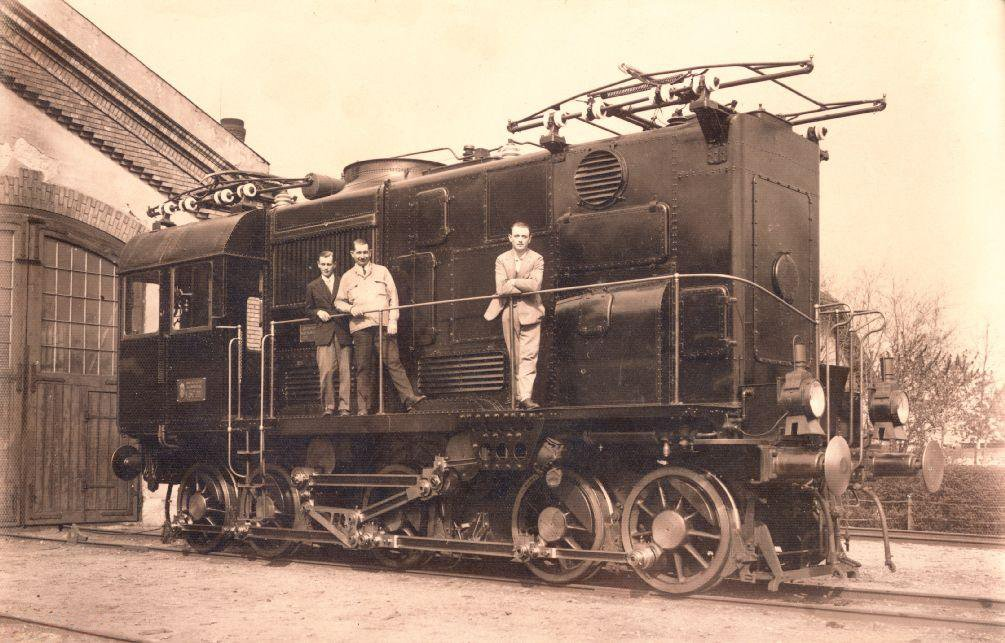
The first locomotive with a phase converter was Kando's V50 locomotive (only for demonstration and testing purposes)

Single-phase power was supplied at 16,000 volts and 50 Hz through a single overhead line and converted to three-phase on the locomotive by a rotary phase converter. The drive motors, made by Metropolitan-Vickers, had a very large diameter of 3 meters and incorporated four sets of 24 magnetic poles each, which could be added to the traction effort at will, producing highly efficient constant speeds of 25, 50, 75 and 100 km/h over rail (or 17/34/51/68 km/h for the V60 heavy freight train engine variant, which had six pairs of smaller driving wheels).

He created an electric machine called a synchronous phase converter, which was a single-phase synchronous motor and a three-phase synchronous generator with common stator and rotor.

It had two independent windings:

- The outer winding is a single-phase synchronous motor. The motor takes the power from the overhead line.
- The inner winding is a three-phase (or variable-phase) synchronous generator, which provides the power for the three- (or more) phase traction motors.

The MÁV company decided to electrify the 190 km long Budapest-Hegyeshalom main line with a new "Kandó system". The system was fed from a three-phase 110 kV transmission line from the Bánhida power station, which had been commissioned in 1930, via a single-phase 16 kV 50 Hz overhead line converted at four transformer stations. Of the four line sections, two are connected to the same phase and the other two are loaded to the other phase. This means that the railway, despite the single-phase supply, still provides a roughly symmetrical load for the power plant. The transformer substations were simple, cheap and with excellent efficiency. The distance between substations was greater than any other system (35–40 km). On an experimental basis, the substation at Torbágy was switched off and the feed was taken over by the substation at Banhida. Even so, uninterrupted service could be maintained for 74 km distance from the feeder. The line, applied his phase-change system, was electrified as far as Komárom and opened for traffic in 1932.

V40 Engine details

The greatest challenge was the creation of a locomotive capable of operating on a 50-cycle power supply. The first prototype locomotive was built in 1913 and underwent modifications based on operational experience. Test runs were conducted on the Budapest-Alag trial line. These experiments led to the development of the V40 series phase-shifting locomotive, also known as the Kandó locomotive.

It had a power output of 2500 horsepower. The 16 kV, single-phase current taken from the overhead line was directly supplied to the primary winding of the phase shifter through the pantograph and the main switch. The phase shifter was an innovative solution that was ahead of its time. This was an extremely complex electrical machine. Its primary winding was located in the stator. This winding, along with the rotor excited by direct current, functioned as a single-phase synchronous motor. The rotor, located in the slots of the stator cores, induced 3, 4, or 6-phase voltages according to the switching sequence. Therefore, the secondary winding forms a multi-phase generator with the rotor. Thus, the phase shifter combines a single-phase synchronous motor and a multi-phase generator in one machine.

Noteworthy is the water cooling system integrated into the windings of the rotor. The locomotive's only motor, a multi-phase induction motor, received a voltage of around 1000 V from the phase shifter. The phase shifter provided a constant 50-cycle current, so changing the speed and rotation was achieved by switching the motor's pole number. The continuous transition between synchronous speeds resulting from pole switching was ensured by water resistance.

Power factor

A major benefit of this arrangement was a power factor of nearly 1.00 in the catenary-attached equipment, which fulfilled the electric powerplants' strict load-distributing regulations. The unacceptably poor power factor of pre-World War II design electric motors (occasionally as low as 0.65) was not felt outside the Kando locomotives, as the phase changer machinery provided isolation.

Speed control

Intermediate speeds were maintained by connecting a water and saltpeter based adjustable resistor to the line, which reduced the efficiency of the locomotive. Timetables for electrified lines were supposed to allow use of full efficiency constant speeds most of the time but, in practice, the need to share the track with trains hauled by MÁV Class 424 steam locomotives meant the water-hungry and wasteful "gearbox resistor" had to be used often.

Kandó triangle drive

The propulsive force was transferred to the locomotive's wheels using a traditional pushrod system, designed to provide manufacturing and maintenance commodity to the predominantly steam-based Hungarian Railways (MÁV) of the time. The so-called Kandó triangle arrangement transferred power from the electric motor to the pushrods in such a way that no oblique forces were exerted on the chassis, making the V40 less hurtful to the rail track compared to steam engines. In practice the V40 pushrod system was too precise for steam-era habits based maintenance and required more frequent care.

Shaft drive

More than a decade after Kandó's death two new, shaft-driven prototypes of his design were built by the Ganz company, to allow for 125 km/h traction speeds. The V44 electric locomotives proved too heavy for general use, owing to their 22 metric ton per axle rail load. Both vehicles were eventually destroyed in USAAF bombing raids in 1944, running only 16,000 kilometers overall.

Bogie-mounted motors

After the second World War, a last series of electric phase-changer locomotives were built by the new communist government in Hungary. Owing to Cold War restrictions, the innovative V55 type, which used bogie-mounted motors, had to be constructed of domestic components entirely and suffered from reliability problems in their double-conversion phase-changer / frequency-changer propulsion system. (The traction motors of pre-WWII V40 and V60 locomotives were made in Britain by the Metropolitan-Vickers company, as part of an economic aid programme organized by Lord Rothermere.)

Preservation

Currently one example of the V40, the V55 and the V60 locomotive each survives. They are preserved at the Budapest Railway History Park, but require restoration after decades of open air static display. If funding permits, the repaired V40 may return to the open track for "nostalgic service", with a semiconductor front-end added to its system for 25 to 16 kV AC down-step conversion.

=== France ===
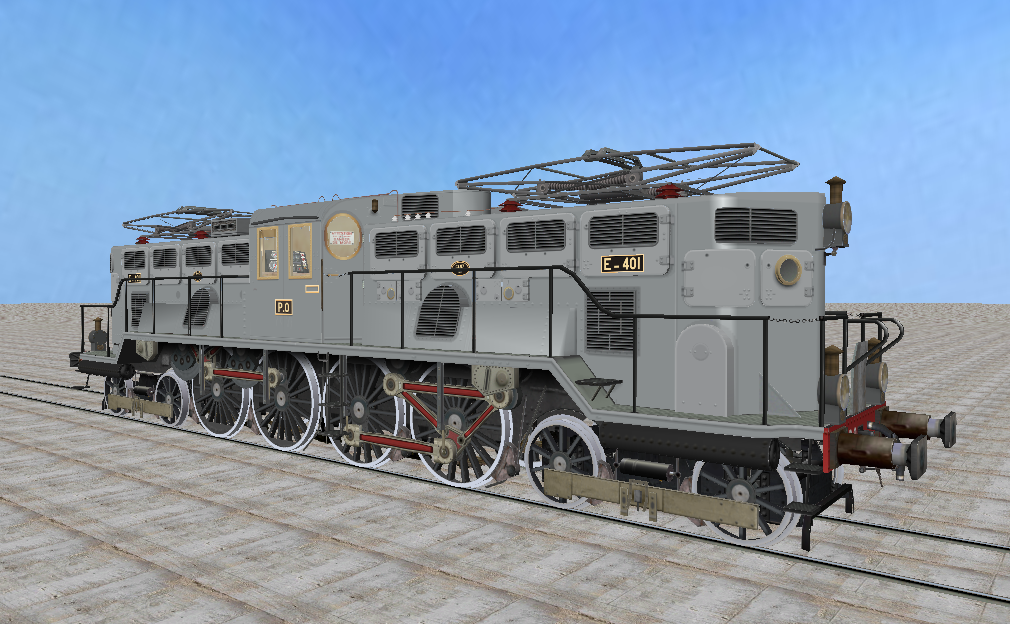

Kandó designed in 1926 the 1.5 kV DC 2BB2 400 (fr:2BB2 400) for the Paris-Orleans line which were the strongest DC locomotives in Europe at that time. The Ganz Works of Budapest, Hungary supplied these two locomotives, to the design of Kálmán Kandó.

=== United Kingdom ===
8 years after the death of Kandó, the engineering office of the Ganz Works won several British tenders, which were mostly based on Kandó's latest technology. British firms were entrusted with the implementation of these plans. There were plans to use the two-wire, three-phase, system on the Portmadoc, Beddgelert and South Snowdon Railway in Wales and the Metropolitan Railway in London but neither of these plans came to fruition due to the outbreak of WWII.

== Death and legacy ==
Kálmán Kandó died of unexpected heart failure in Budapest on January 13, 1931. He did not live to see the final commissioning of his system, the realisation of his masterpiece, the locomotive he had designed. On 17 August 1932, the first phase-changing locomotive, V40 001, was tested by the engineers. After his death, the development of the electric locomotive continued on the path he had set, under the direction of Ferenc Ratkovszky and Andor Mándi.

Many modern electric trains work on the same three-phase high tension AC principle introduced by the Kandó V40 locomotives, but the rotary converter is replaced by semiconductor devices. Three-phase powered electric motors allow for high traction effort even at great speeds and the difficulty of maintaining arbitrary speeds at full efficiency is eliminated by using IGBT semiconductors and the use of digital controls.

The number of Kálmán Kandó's patents granted between 1895 and 1929 is 69. More than 50 patents were bought by locomotive and rolling stock manufacturing companies in foreign countries like the UK, US, Germany, France and Italy. The patents are grouped around the topics of electric railway motors, multi-phase AC motors, automatic railway switching devices, overhead lines, phase converters, railway safety techniques and power transmission stations.

In Miskolc, the square in front of the Tiszai railway station, where his statue is also standing, bears his name, as well as a vocational secondary school. In Budapest, the Kandó Kálmán Faculty of Electrical Engineering (formerly an independent technical college, now part of Óbuda University), also bears his name. The minor planet 126245 Kandókálmán was named after him.

== See also ==
- List of railway electrification systems
- Railway electrification
- Three-phase AC railway electrification
