= Three-phase AC railway electrification =

Railway electrification system

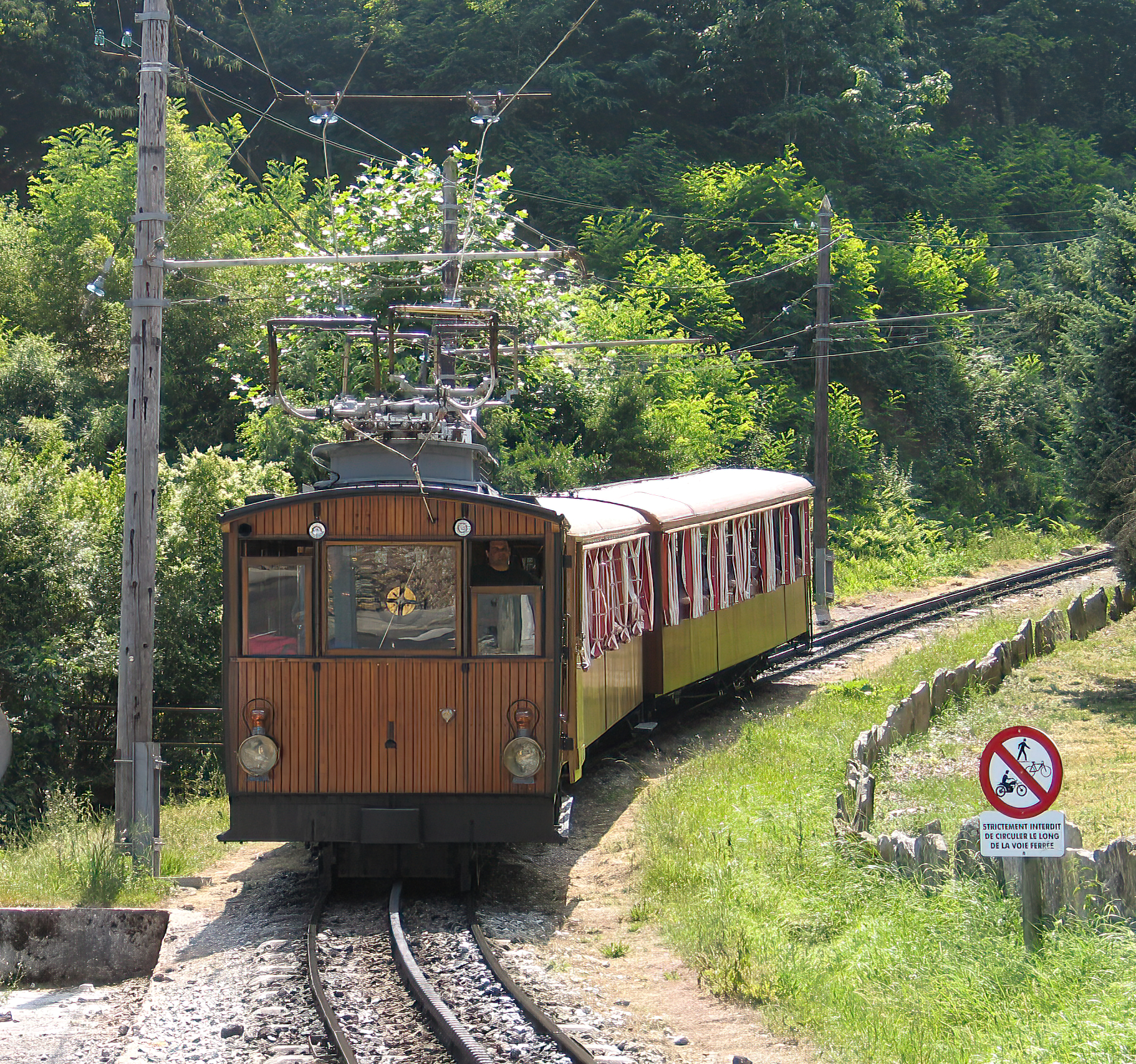
Train using a multiphase electrification system on the Petit train de la Rhune, France

Three-phase AC railway electrification, which promised some advantages over established DC electric rail power and steam traction, started at the turn of the twentieth century. The first standard gauge line, from 1899 to 1933, was from Burgdorf to Thun in Switzerland (40 km or 25 miles). Italy was the major user, from 1901 until 1976, although lines through two tunnels also used the system; the Simplon Tunnel between Switzerland and Italy from 1906 to 1930 (but not connected to the Italian system), and the Cascade Tunnel of the Great Northern Railway in the United States from 1909 to 1939. Single phase AC railways with a single overhead line proved more practical.

Since the 1980s, modern electric locomotives use three-phase AC internally, generated from a single overhead line, thanks to advances in semiconductor inverter technology. These inverters are also used in electric cars, from a DC battery, or from DC photovoltaic panels into the three-phase AC grid.

== Advantages ==
The system provides regenerative braking with the power fed back to the system, so is particularly suitable for mountain railways (provided the grid or another locomotive on the line can accept the power). The locomotives use three-phase induction motors. Lacking brushes and commutators, they require less maintenance. The early Italian and Swiss systems used a low frequency (16 2/3 Hz), and a relatively low voltage (3,000 or 3,600 Volts) compared with later AC systems. (However, both regenerative braking and 16 2/3 Hz were successfully implemented also for single-phase systems, like for the Swiss Ce 6/8 II and III "Crocodile" type.)

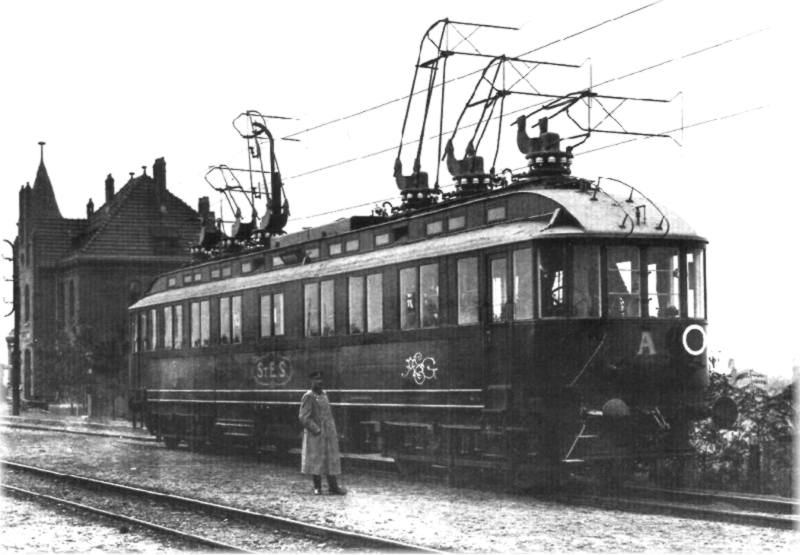
German Experimental three-phase railcar in 1903 set the speed record at 210.2 km/h (130.6 mph)

In Germany, the Siemens and AEG Experimental three-phase railcars set new overall speed records, in 1903 at 210.2 km/h (130.6 mph), faster than any other manned vehicle for about a decade. Due to issues with the three overhead wire concept, German railways continued with single phase AC.

== Disadvantages ==
The overhead wiring, generally having two separate overhead lines and the rail for the third phase, was more complicated, and the low frequency used required a separate generation or conversion and distribution system. Train speed was restricted from one to four speeds which obtained by pole-changing, cascade operation or both.

== Historical systems ==
The following is a list of the railways that have used this method of electrification in the past:

- The Cascade Tunnel of the Great Northern Railway.
- The Ferrovia della Valtellina in Italy.
- The Giovi Railway between Genoa and Pontedecimo in Italy.
- The Italian part of the Mont-Cenis line Turin–Modane.
- Many other lines in Northern Italy.
- The Santa Fe - Gergal line in Spain.
- The Burgdorf–Thun railway in Switzerland.
- The Simplon Tunnel between Switzerland and Italy.

== Locomotives ==
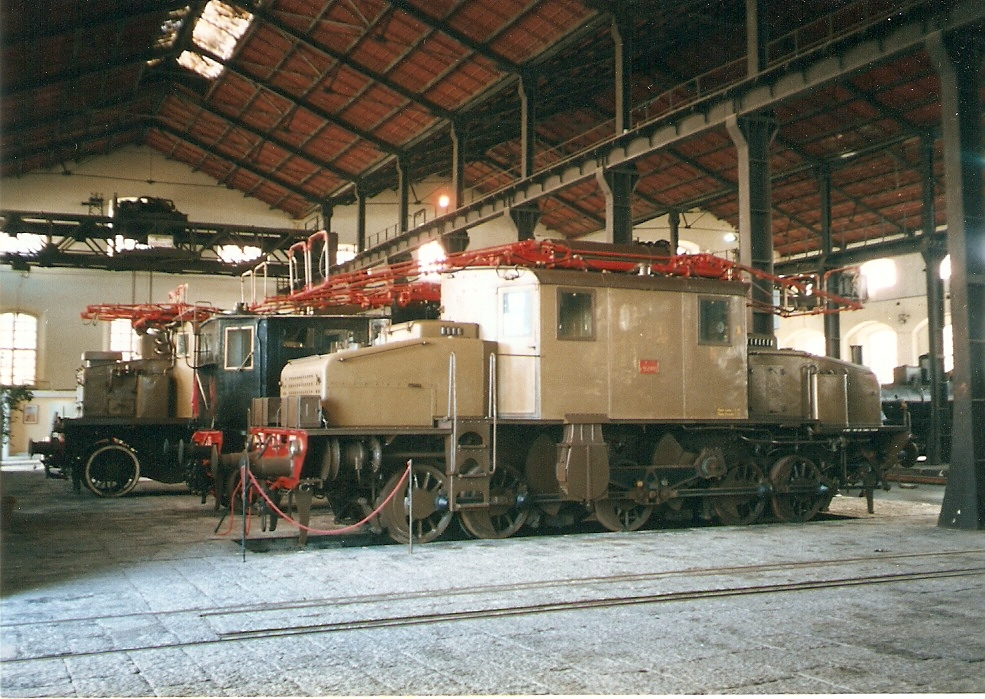
FS Class E.550 (Italy 1906–1965)

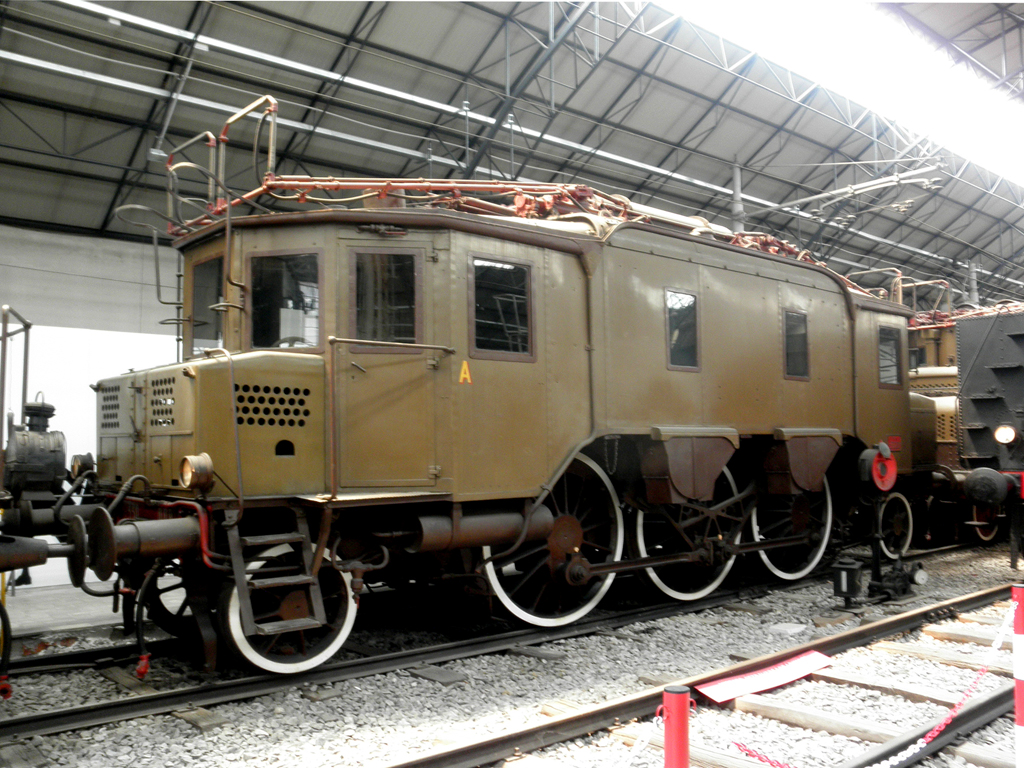
FS Class E330 (Italy 1914–1963). Note the long bow collectors, with their pickup points at the far ends of the locomotive.

Usually, the locomotives had one, two, or four motors on the body chassis (not on the bogies), and did not require gearing. The induction motors are designed to run at a particular synchronous speed, and when they run above the synchronous speed downhill, power is fed back to the system. Pole changing and cascade (concatenation) working was used to allow two or four different speeds, and resistances (often liquid rheostats) were required for starting. In Italy freight locomotives used plain cascade with two speeds, 25 and 50 km/h (16 and 31 mph); while express locomotives used cascade combined with pole-changing, giving four speeds, 37, 50, 75, 100 km/h (23, 31, 47, 62 mph). With the use of 3,000 or 3,600 volts at 16 2/3 (16.7) Hz, the supply could be fed directly to the motor without an onboard transformer.

Generally, the motor(s) fed a single axle, with other wheels linked by connecting rods, as the induction motor is sensitive to speed variations and with non-linked motors on several axles the motors on worn wheels would do little or even no work as they would rotate faster. This motor characteristic led to a mishap in the Cascade Tunnel to a GN east-bound freight train with four electric locomotives, two on the head and two pushing. The two pushers suddenly lost power and the train gradually slowed to a stop, but the lead unit engineer was unaware that his train had stopped, and held the controller on the power position until the usual time to transit the tunnel had elapsed. Not seeing daylight, he finally shut down the locomotive, and found that the wheels of his stationary locomotive had ground through two-thirds of the rail web.

== Overhead wiring ==
Generally two separate overhead wires are used, with the rail for the third phase, though occasionally three overhead wires are used. At junctions, crossovers and crossings the two lines must be kept apart, with a continuous supply to the locomotive, which must have two live conductors wherever it stops. Hence two collectors per overhead phase are used, but the possibility of bridging a dead section and causing a short circuit from the front collector of one phase to the back collector of the other phase must be avoided. The resistance of the rails used for the third phase or return is higher for AC than for DC due to "skin effect", but lower for the low frequency used than for industrial frequency. Losses are also increased, though not in the same proportion, as the impedance is largely reactive.

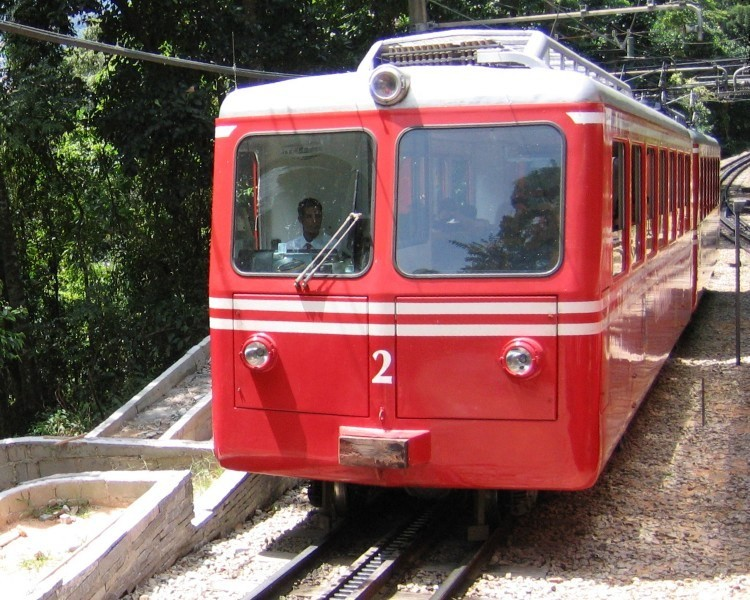
3-phase pantograph on a Corcovado Rack Railway train in Brazil

The locomotive needs to pick up power from two (or three) overhead conductors. Early locomotives on the Italian State Railways used a wide bow collector which covered both wires but later locomotives used a wide pantograph with two collector bars, side by side. A three-phase system is also prone to larger lengthwise gaps between sections, owing to the complexity of two-wire overhead, and so a long pickup base is needed. In Italy this was achieved with the long bow collectors reaching right to the ends of the locomotive, or with a pair of pantographs, also mounted as far apart as possible.

In the United States, a pair of trolley poles were used. They worked well with a maximum speed of 15 miles per hour (24 km/h). The dual conductor pantograph system is used on four mountain railways that continue to use three-phase power (Corcovado Rack Railway in Rio de Janeiro, Brazil, Jungfraubahn and Gornergratbahn in Switzerland and the Petit train de la Rhune in France).

== See also ==
- Three-phase electric power
- Railway electrification system#Polyphase alternating current systems
- 15 kV AC railway electrification
- 25 kV AC railway electrification
- Category:Three-phase AC locomotives
