= Bow collector =

Electric current transfer device

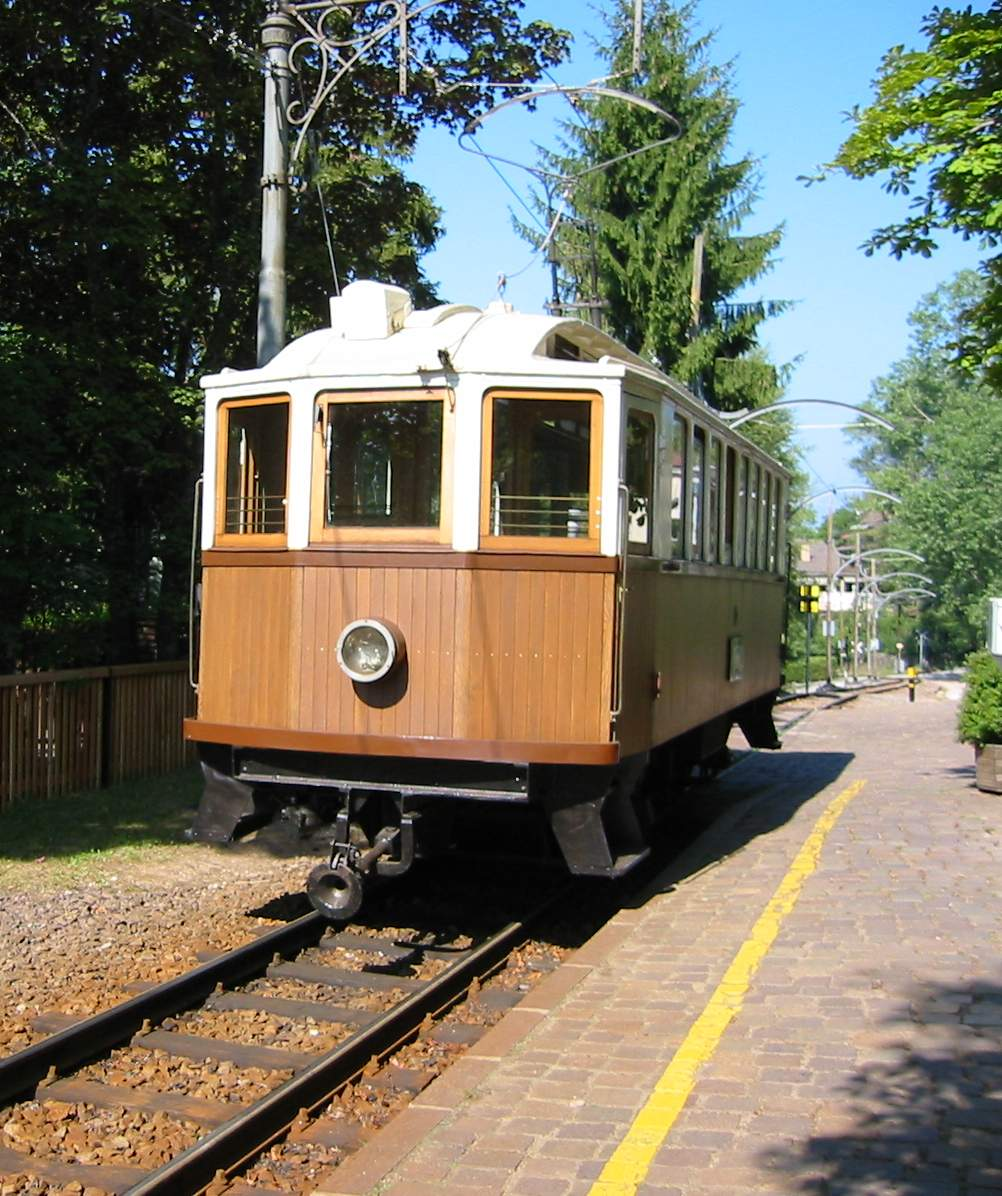
An old tram with a bow collector built in 1907 still running in Ritten, South Tyrol, Italy

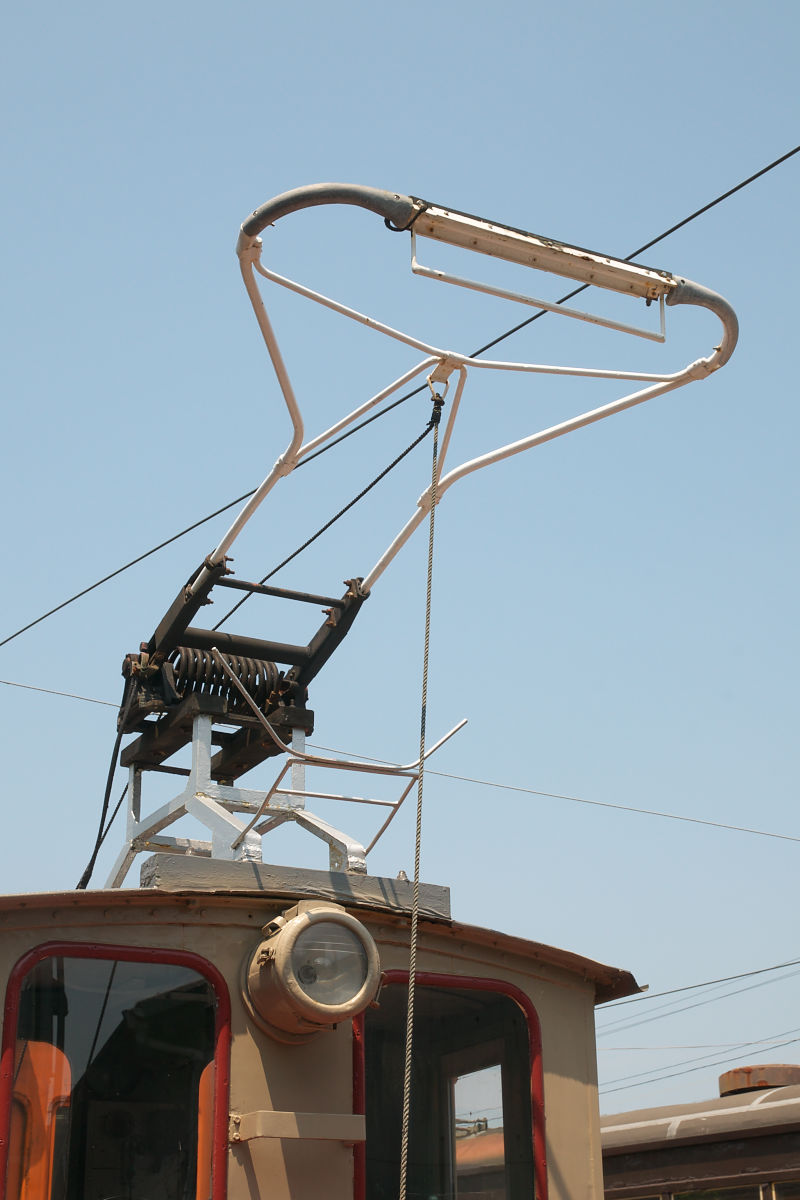
A bow collector on a small electric locomotive

A bow collector is one of the three main devices used on tramcars to transfer electric current from the wires above to the tram below. While once very common in continental Europe, it was replaced by the pantograph.

== Origins ==
The first bow collector was designed by the German engineer Walter Reichel in 1889 and shown at the World Expo in Paris the same year. Reichel worked closely with Ernst Werner von Siemens, and with Siemens being a dominating force in the development of tramways in Europe, the bow collector quickly became the standard solution on the continent for collecting current. Reichel also designed the bow collectors used on the Gross Lichterfelde Tramway, the worlds first public tramway, when it was converted to overhead wire 1891 (it collected current from the rails before that). The Hobart electric tramway system - the first of its kind in the Southern Hemisphere, opened in 1893 - used Siemens cars with very early bow collectors. Many other continental European and some British tramway systems, including Leeds and Glasgow, also used this method.

== Construction ==
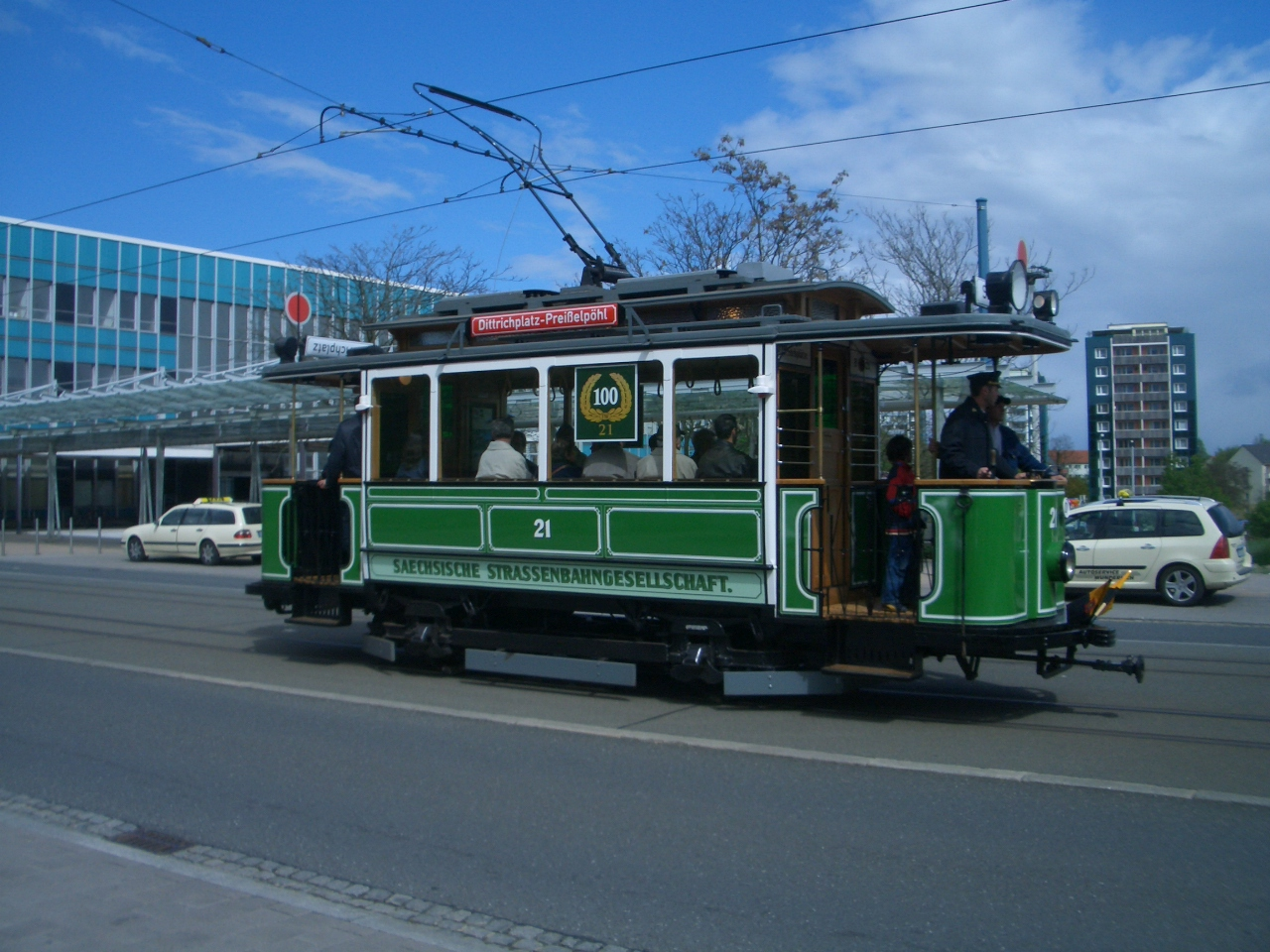
An historical tram with a bow collector in Plauen, Germany

The bow collector is one of the simplest and most reliable methods of current collection used on tramways. The very earliest versions were simply very heavy-gauge wire or steel bars bent into a rectangular shape and mounted long-side-down on the tramcar roof. The collector was then raised by a spring, so that its top edge would press against the wire above. That top edge is made of a 1-inch (25 mm) (or more) wide steel rod, machined to have a bow-shaped cross section; that cross-section inspired the name. This bow-shaped rod is referred to as the 'collector plate', and in later models may be up to several inches wide, positive polarity are collected by the bow while the other polarity are at the rails, these are for safety purposes. Unlike many trolley poles, the bow collector does not normally have a revolving base (an exception was in Rome, where the entire assembly could be revolved), but is rather fixed centrally to the tramcar's roof.

After 1900, the simple framing methods mentioned above were gradually replaced by more complex and sophisticated methods, but the general mode of operation remained the same. The changes of design are most noticeable on systems where both double- and single-deck cars were used on the same system. Single deck trams usually have tall and lightly constructed collectors with complicated frames to support the heavy cast-steel collector plate, while double-deck cars usually have heavier collectors with less complicated frames.

To maintain good electrical contact, the bow collector must exert quite strong pressure on the wire above, and so a complex system of springs or weights are put into use to ensure good electrical contact. The wire itself has to be tensioned and kept as flat as possible, a requirement shared for both bow collectors and pantographs.

The steel rails on the tracks act as the electrical return.

== Operation ==
Properly the bow collector should be mounted in such a way so that the top edge of the collector plate would rise several inches above the wire when the collector frame is standing straight up. Thus the collector usually leans opposite to the direction of travel; when the time comes to travel in the opposite direction, the collector must be swung over. To allow this to happen, the overhead wire must be raised by several inches at places where the bows are swung over, such as terminals and turn-outs. This operation is usually achieved by ropes and pulleys. The collector is folded down to a horizontal position when the car is not in use.

Some early cars had no means to swing the bows over. It was thought that this would happen automatically when the tramcar started travelling the other way, but collectors such as these were a failure.

Most Soviet trams (of which some are still in use in the USSR's successor states) had no means to swing the bows over. These trams were "single-ended", and not designed to travel both ways. Some trams, such as the KTV-55-2 tram, had two bow collectors to handle both directions.

== Advantages and modern usage ==
The bow collector has fewer moving parts than the trolley pole, but is heavier and sometimes more complicated to construct. The construction of overhead wires for bow collectors is simpler than trolley pole wiring. As bow collectors do not have revolving mountings, the collector cannot jump off the wire or follow the wrong one at intersections, as trolley poles sometimes do. Thus overhead 'frogs' and guides for trolley poles are not necessary with bow collectors. Bow collectors are, however, much noisier than trolley poles.

The overhead wires for bow collectors are stretched tighter than for trolley poles, and straight sections are 'staggered', that is, the wire does not run completely straight down the centreline of the track, but rather zig-zags slightly across a small distance. This distributes wear across the bow collector's collector plate, and extends the collector's life. Overhead wires also are 'staggered' for pantographs, so systems may replace bow collectors with pantographs on the trams without modifying the overhead.

In addition to some vintage tramways, bow collectors are still used in some tram systems in the former Soviet Union, e. g., in Kazan, Minsk, and Dzerzhinsk.

=== Rigid collectors ===
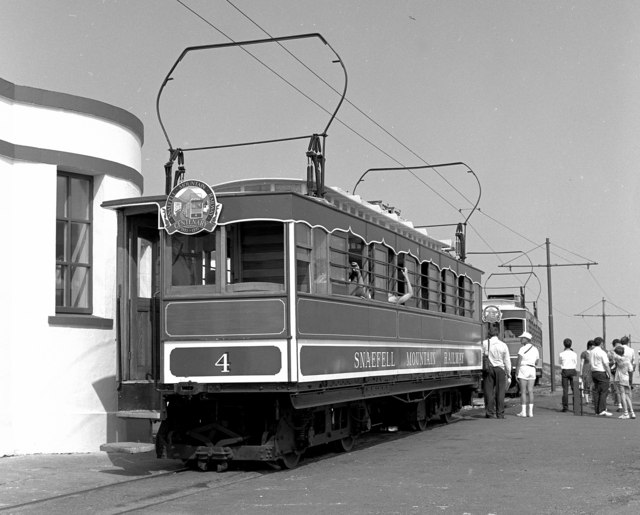
Rigid bow collectors at Snaefell Summit station

On the Isle of Man, the Snaefell Mountain Railway's implementation is unusual in that the overhead wire is slack and free to hang in a catenary. Hopkinson bow collectors are used, to avoid problems with trolley poles in high winds on the mountainous route – the Snaefell line also uses a Fell rail for braking. Each car has two rigidly vertical bow collectors, with a slack wire above them making contact under its own weight. The collectors are not quite tall enough to make contact with the wire at its suspension points. They are far enough apart, relative to the pole spacing, so that while one is out of contact with the wire the other is mid span and making good contact. The collectors can only be lowered by unbolting them at roof level, whilst the power is off. This inability to isolate them easily hampered fire fighting when car 5 caught fire in 1970.

Similar collectors were also used at first on the nearby and slightly earlier Manx Electric Railway. They gave trouble initially with poor contact and so the slack wire system was developed. A tensioned wire usually gave a good contact but broke contact when the collector passed the pole. Slackening the wire and deliberately lifting it up clear of the collector at the poles allowed its weight to give a reliable contact over the other collector, spaced to be at the midpoint between poles. A revised collector was in use within the first few years, by 1900. A small hinged bow frame was placed on top of the fixed uprights, giving a sprung contact. Bow collectors did not last though and were replaced with trolley poles.

== List of tram systems using bow collector ==
Country	Network	Route length	Voltage	Notes
China	Trams in Dalian	23.4 km	550 V	Only part of the fleet
Turkey	Istanbul nostalgic tramways	4.2 km	750 V	Heritage streetcar
Russia	Trams in Vladivostok	5.5 km		
Russia	Trams in Volchansk	7.9 km	550 V	
Isle of Man	Snaefell Mountain Railway	8.9 km	550 V	

A lot of tram systems using pantographs on main rolling stock have some heritage fleet with bow collectors.

== See also ==
- Current collector
