= 2BB2 400 =

French electric locomotive

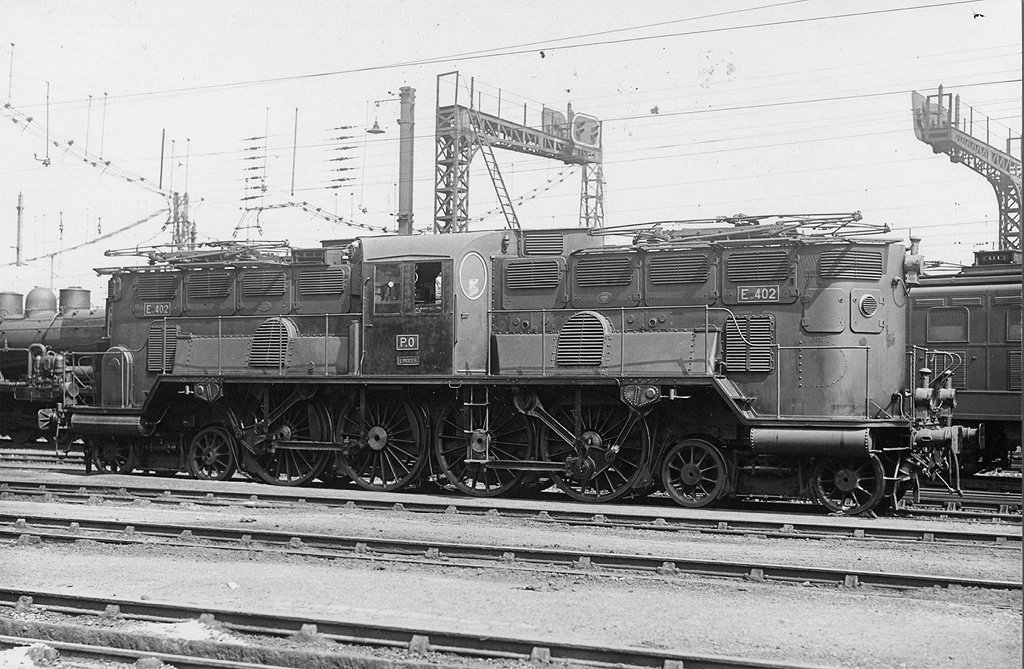
Type and origin
- Power type: Electric, direct current
- Builder: Ganz Works, Hungary
- Serial number: E.401 E.402
- Build date: 1926
- Total produced: 2
Specifications
- Configuration
  - Whyte: 4-4-4-4
  - AAR: 2-B-B-2
  - UIC: 2'BB2' (single frame)
- Gauge: 1,435 mm (4 ft 8 1/2 in)
- Bogies: pilot and trailing to Kandó special design
- Wheel diameter: 1750
- Trailing dia.: 970
- Wheelbase: 2200+1570+1850+1850+1850+1570+2200
- Length: 16040
- Height: 4100 (cab roof, pantographs down)
- Frame type: rigid through underframe
- Axle load: 18,2 t
- Adhesive weight: 72.1 t (159,000 lb)
- Loco weight: 131.69 t (290,300 lb)
- Power supply: overhead catenary for pantograph contact & 3rd rail
- Electric system/s: 1,500 V DC overhead
- Current pickups: 2 roof-mounted pantographs 550-750 V third rail collector shoes on pilot/trailing trucks for use in Paris tunnel for Gare d'Orsay (E401 only?)
- Traction motors: 4× 895 kW (1,200 hp)
- Transmission: 2*2 Kandó articulated rod frames, 2*2 side rods
Performance figures
- Maximum speed: 120 km/h (75 mph)
- Power output: 3,600 kW (4,800 hp)
- Tractive effort
  - Starting: 240 kN (54,000 lb_{f})
  - Continuous: 176 kN (40,000 lb_{f})
Career
- Operators: PO SNCF
- Number in class: 2
- Numbers: P.O.: E 402, E 402 ; SNCF 2BB2 401 & 402
- Nicknames: Les Belles Hongroises
- Axle load class: 18 t (40,000 lb)
- Withdrawn: 1938
- Scrapped: 1942 (? - remains to be checked; wartime!)

The 2BB2 400 class were two electric locomotives built in 1926 for the Paris Orléans (PO) railway of France.

After wartime coal shortages during World War I, post-war reconstruction from 1919 focussed on electrification, powered by hydro electricity. In 1923 the PO began electrification of the 200 km section of the Toulouse main line from Paris to Vierzon using a supply of 1,500 V DC. The Ganz Works of Budapest, Hungary supplied these two locomotives, to the design of Kálmán Kandó.

The arrangement of the locomotives was unusual for DC locomotives and may have been influenced by Kandó's other designs for AC locomotives, with the large diameter frame-mounted AC motors of the period. The four DC motors were mounted rigidly on the frame, above the driving wheels. Each motor drove an external jackshaft crank, with the four driving axles coupled in pairs. Drive between the motor jackshafts and the wheels was by coupling rods. As express passenger locomotives, this also permitted large diameter driving wheels, rather than small-wheeled bogies beneath the frames. Suspension travel between the driven wheels and the fixed motors was achieved through Kandó's triangular linkage design (E401: "hyperstatic" with top linkage rod between motor cranks, E402: "isostatic" without such top cross-linkage rod.

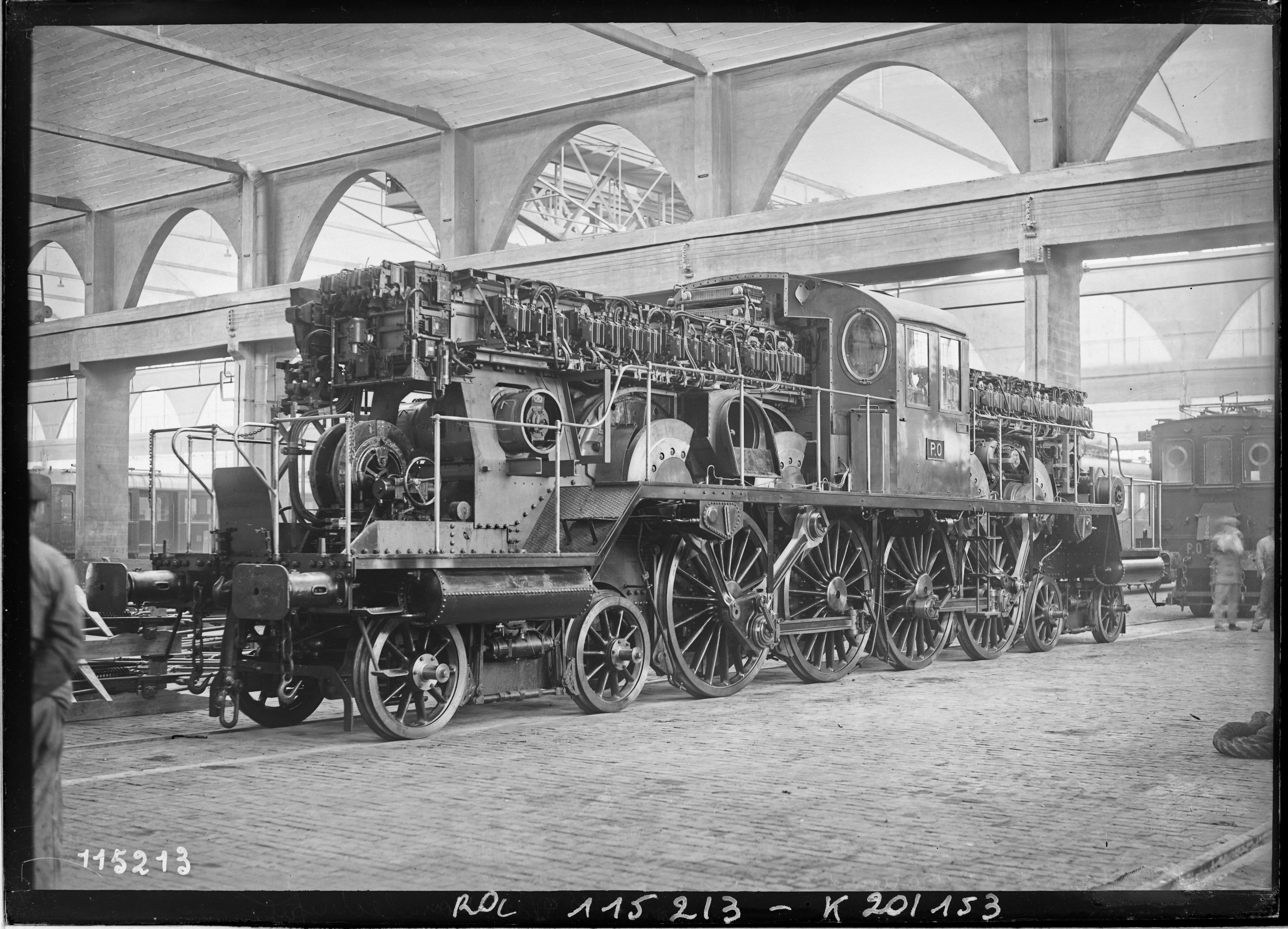
During final construction in 1926

The coupled wheels, rather than individual traction motors, enhanced resistance to wheelslip. This advantage was recognised and influenced future French designs, such as the typically French monomotor bogie rather than the axle-hung traction motors used elsewhere. Further, the pilot and trailing trucks under the through main frame were specially-designed by K.de Kandó in guiding both adjacent (!) driving axles; it might be considered a combination of Krauss-Helmholtz, Krauss-Lotter pilot, and Beugniot-Baldwin trucks, but featured some intricacies for a gradual transfer of guiding flange forces to the driving axles.

In service, the locomotives proved fast and powerful, but were unreliable. When other passenger locomotives became available, they were restricted to freight work at up to 80 kilometres per hour (50 mph). Despite this they were popular with their crews, encouraged by the French practice of attaching crews to the same locomotive. They gained the class nickname, Les Belles Hongroises. Their later years were spent in freight-only service based at Limoges. They survived into SNCF service until 1938, keeping their original numbers, but were withdrawn and scrapped that year. (Note: Some sources give 1942 as a scrapping date. One is FJG Haut, "History of the Electric Locomotive" p.58 (to be counterchecked vs. Machefert-Tassin, Woimant, Nouvion: "Histoire de la traction éléctrique", Tome 1)) (Note: Modelling: With none of the two locomotives surviving, their controversial design and styling is memorized by a FULGUREX model #2227: https://www.reynaulds.com/products/Fulgurex/2227.aspx , the Kandó drive being a particular challenge)
