= Pennsylvania Railroad class DD1 =

Class of 66 (33 pairs) of American 2′B+B2′ electric locomotives

PRR DD1
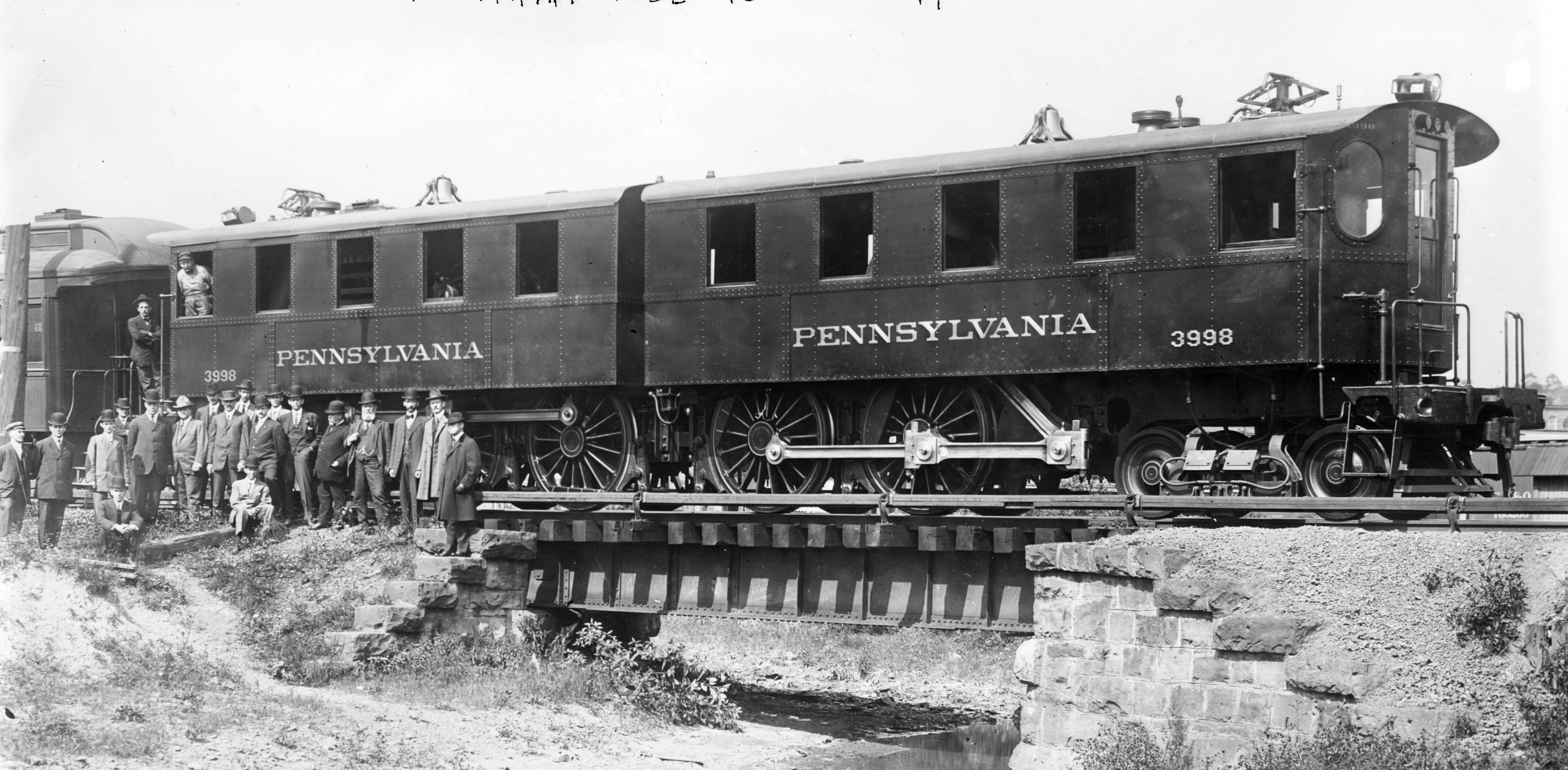
Type and origin
- Power type: Electric
- Builder: Altoona Works
- Build date: 1910–1911
- Total produced: 66 (in 33 married pairs)
Specifications
- Configuration
  - Whyte: 4-4-0+0-4-4RE
  - AAR: 2-B+B-2
  - UIC: 2′B+B2′
- Gauge: 4 ft 8 1/2 in (1,435 mm) standard gauge
- Leading dia.: 36 in (914 mm)
- Driver dia.: 72 in (1,829 mm)
- Wheelbase: 7 ft 5 in (2.26 m) between driving axles
- Length: 64 ft 11 in (19.79 m)
- Width: 9 ft 1 in (2.77 m)
- Height: 14 ft 8 in (4.47 m)
- Adhesive weight: 199,000 lb (90,260 kilograms; 90.26 tonnes)
- Loco weight: 313,000 lb (142,000 kilograms; 142.0 tonnes)
- Electric system/s: 650 V DC third rail
- Current pickup: Contact shoe
- Traction motors: 2 × 315-A 2,000 hp (1,500 kW)
- Transmission: Resistance controlled DC current supplied to DC motors connected to the axles through Jackshaft and side rods
Performance figures
- Maximum speed: 85 mph (137 km/h)
- Power output: 1,580 hp (1,180 kW) continuous
- Tractive effort: 55,500 lbf (247 kN)

The Pennsylvania Railroad DD1 was a class of boxcab electric locomotives built by the Pennsylvania Railroad. The locomotives were developed as part of the railroad's New York Tunnel Extension, which built the original Pennsylvania Station in New York City and linked it to New Jersey via the North River Tunnels. The Pennsylvania built a total of 66 locomotives in its Altoona Works; they operated in semi-permanently coupled pairs. Westinghouse supplied the electrical equipment.

The first locomotives entered service in 1910, with the opening of Pennsylvania Station. They operated between Manhattan Transfer and Pennsylvania Station, and from there to the coach yards at Sunnyside Yard in Queens, New York. With the arrival of the Class L5 locomotives in 1924, some DD1s moved to the Pennsylvania-owned Long Island Rail Road (LIRR), which had substantial electrified commuter rail operations. The conversion of the New York–Philadelphia main line to alternating current in the 1930s saw the remainder of the DD1s scrapped or transferred to the LIRR. One pair, Nos. 3936 and 3937, is preserved at the Railroad Museum of Pennsylvania and is listed on the National Register of Historic Places.

== Design ==
Each semi-permanently coupled pair had a length of 64 feet 11 inches (19.8 m) and weighed 313,000 pounds (142,000 kg). DD1-class locomotives were nearly always operated as a pair—never individually and rarely as two pairs in a double-heading configuration. The PRR classed their 4-4-0 locomotives as class D, and the DD1 was essentially two 4-4-0 locomotives coupled back to back, resulting in the new class, DD. Each pair was assigned a single "Electrified Zone Number" (EZN); the EZN simplified train dispatching for each pair of DD1s while their original individual serial numbers were used for the mechanical records of the locomotives.

Each locomotive had its own Westinghouse 315-A, direct current, commutating pole, electric motors within a monocoque cab. The motors had a continuous power rating of 1,580 horsepower (1,180 kW) at 58 miles per hour (93 km/h), and could produce up to 2,130 horsepower (1,590 kW) at 38 miles per hour (61 km/h) for no more than an hour. Their top speed was 85 miles per hour (137 km/h), but PRR/LIRR timetables had a speed limit of 65 miles per hour (105 km/h). The motors were connected to the two 72-inch (1,829 mm) drivers via a jackshaft and coupling rods. The design of the DD1 served as a transition between steam locomotives and modern electric locomotives. Despite their ungainly appearance, DD1s ran "quietly and smoothly...with no appreciable rod clanking", and had a very low maintenance cost. DD1 locomotives operated off 650 volt direct current from a third rail.

== History ==
The first DD1-class of locomotives were introduced into regular passenger service on November 27, 1910 to operate in the North River Tunnels under the Hudson River. As steam locomotives were prohibited from entering the tunnels, the electric DD1 shuttled passengers from the Pennsylvania Railroad's Manhattan Transfer station in New Jersey and Pennsylvania Station in New York City.

A total of 66 locomotives were constructed by the Pennsylvania Railroad's Juniata Shops in Altoona starting in 1909; 3936 and 3937 were put into service in 1911. As the new L5s were being introduced in 1924, most DD1s were transferred to the Long Island Rail Road. Both 3936 and 3937 were shifted from mainline passenger duty, and hauled the empty passenger trains from Pennsylvania Station to Sunnyside Yard. The Long Island Rail Road scrapped most of its DD1s from 1949 to 1951, and only two pairs remained in 1962. By 1978, Nos. 3936 and 3937 comprised the last existing DD1 and were donated to the Railroad Museum of Pennsylvania in Strasburg, Pennsylvania by the Pennsylvania's successor Penn Central, as part of a collection with twelve other historically significant locomotives. Both locomotives were jointly listed on the National Register of Historic Places on December 17, 1979.

== Gallery ==
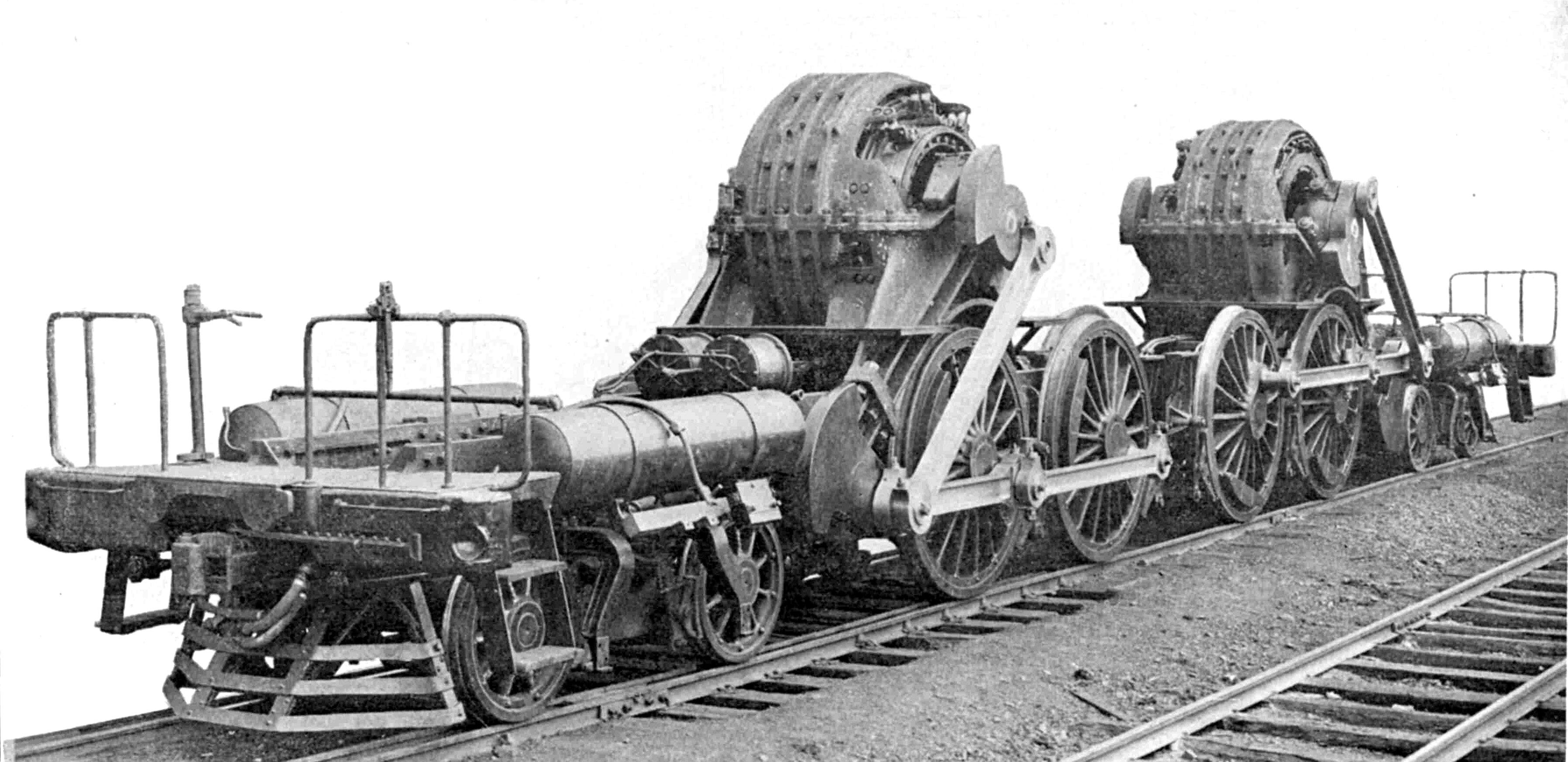
Running gear and electrical equipment

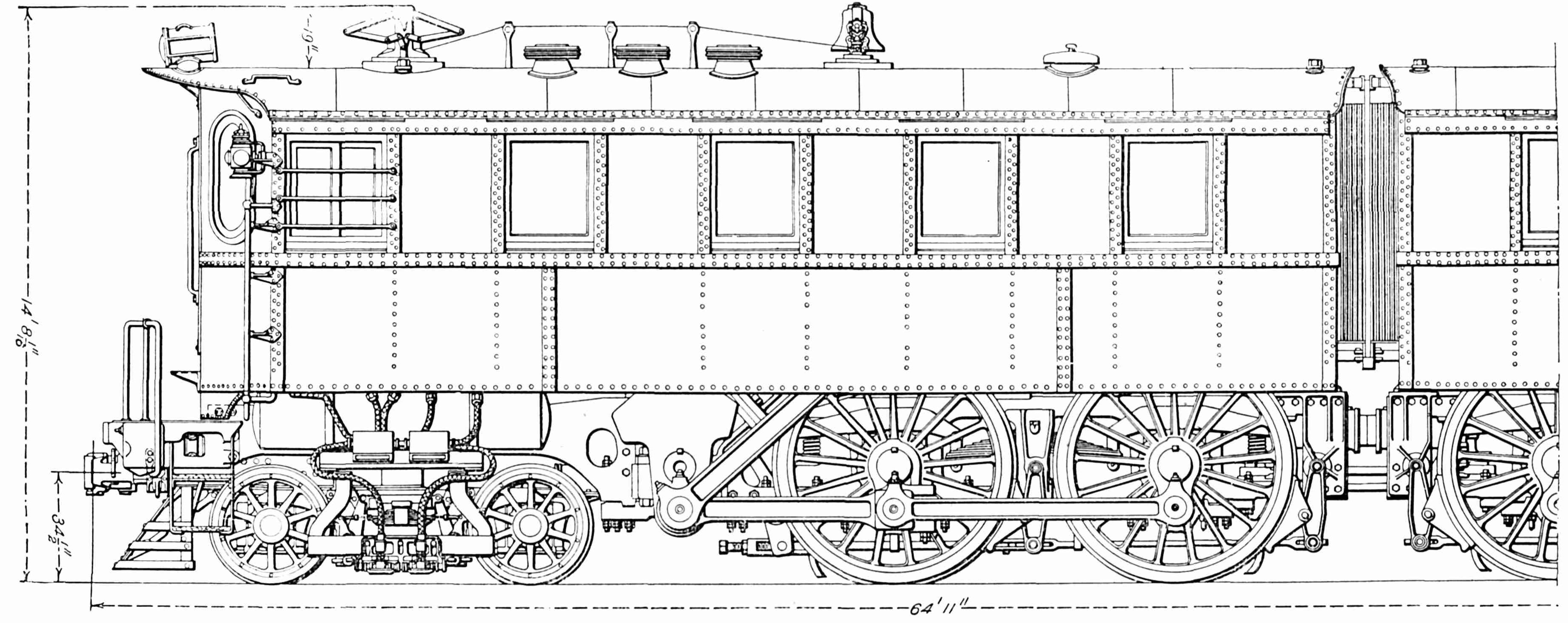
Side-view drawing

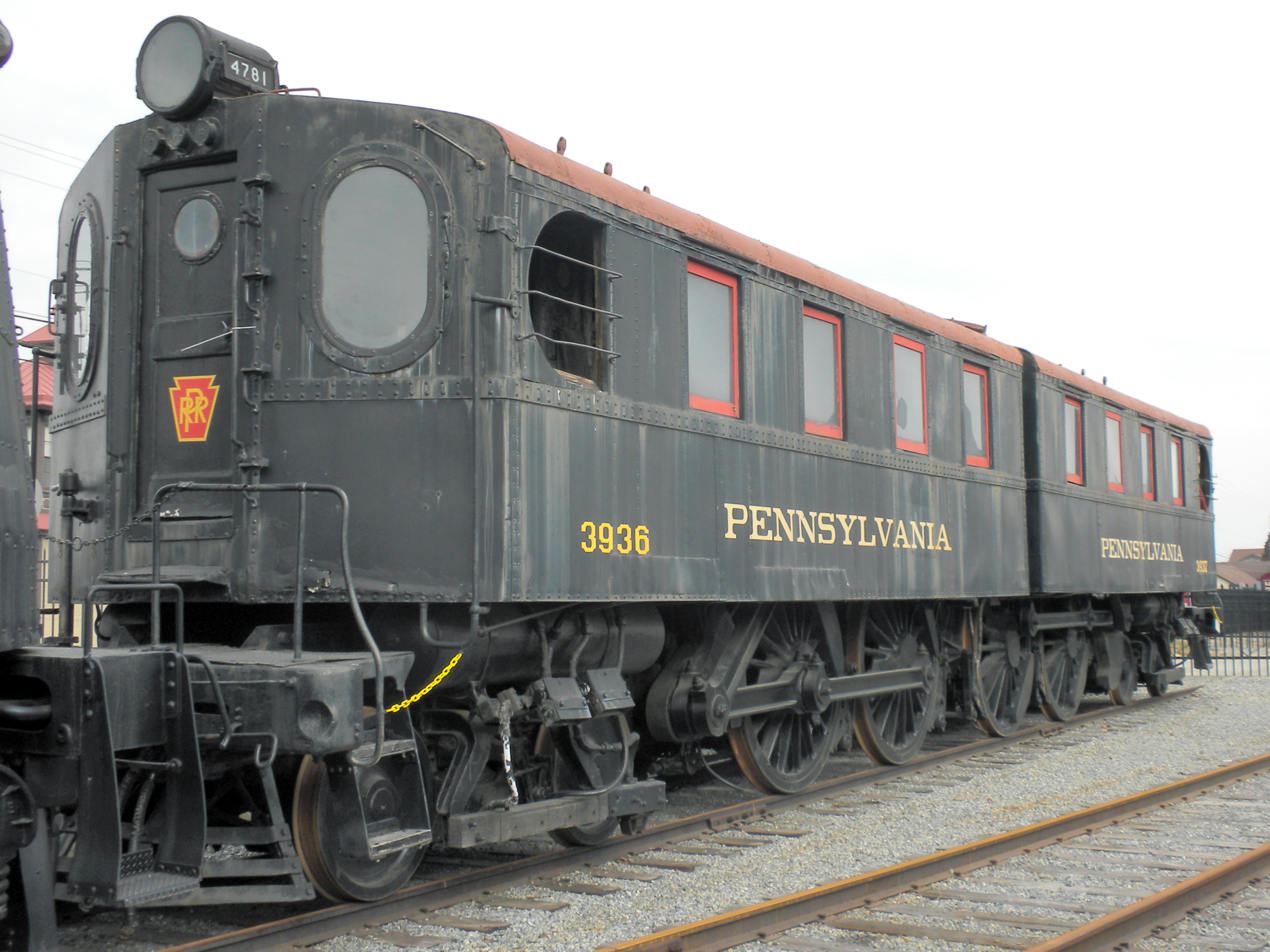
The surviving DD1 3936 and 3937

== See also ==
- PRR locomotive classification
