= Pennsylvania Railroad class L5 =

PRR L5
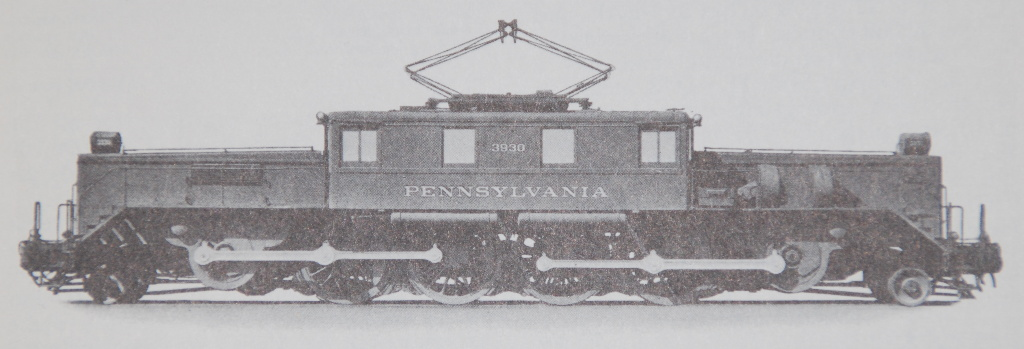
- Builder's photograph of L5 #3930
Type and origin
- Power type: Electric
- Builder: Altoona Works; In association with: Westinghouse; General Electric; Brown Boveri
- Build date: 1924-1928
- Total produced: L5paw: 1 L5pdw: 12; L5pdb: 6 L5pdg: 6 Total: 25
Specifications
- Configuration
  - Whyte: 2-4-4-2RE; 2-4-4-2OE (L5paw)
  - AAR: 1-B-B-1
  - UIC: 1′B-B1′
- Gauge: 4 ft 8 1/2 in (1,435 mm) standard gauge
- Leading dia.: 36 in (914 mm)
- Driver dia.: 80 in (2,032 mm)
- Wheelbase: 22 ft 3 in (6.78 m) between driving axles
- Length: 68 ft 2 in (20.78 m)
- Height: 14 ft 8 in (4.47 m)
- Adhesive weight: 308,600 lb (140,000 kilograms; 140.0 metric tons)
- Loco weight: 408,600 lb (185,300 kilograms; 185.3 metric tons)
- Electric system/s: 650 V DC third rail 11 kV 25 hz AC overhead catenary ( L5paw )
- Current pickups: Contact shoe Pantograph (L5paw)
- Traction motors: 4 × 835 hp (623 kW)
- Transmission: Resistance controlled DC or tap changer controlled AC supplied to AC-DC universal motors connected to the axles through Jackshaft and side rods
Performance figures
- Maximum speed: 70 mph (110 km/h)
- Power output: 3,340 hp (2,490 kW)
- Tractive effort: 59,000 lbf (260 kN)

The Pennsylvania Railroad's class L5 were the railroad's second generation of production electric locomotives after the DD1, and the last to use a jackshaft and side rods to drive the wheels. The L5 was a single-unit locomotive instead of the twin-unit DD1. The wheel arrangement in Whyte notation was 2-4-4-2, or 1-B-B-1 in the AAR scheme. Twenty five were built in 4 distinct subclasses. The lead unit of the class was equipped for AC operation with an overhead pantograph (later two), while the other 24 were third rail DC units to work on the existing PRR third rail electrification in the New York area.

The class was built with an eye towards future long distance electrification with the idea of a single class that could be used interchangeably between the present and future AC electrified zones and the DC electrified zone in New York City. The PRR also used the L5 order to try out electrical equipment manufacturers other than Westinghouse, which had provided the propulsion equipment for both the DD1 and FF1 classes. The original classes were to be simply L5 for the AC units and L5a for the DC units, but as the additional equipment suppliers were brought on the scheme changed to include the intended function (passenger), the current used and finally the electrical supplier. Westinghouse supplied the majority of the units with 1 L5Paw class and 12 L5pdw class. General Electric and Brown Boveri each supplied 6 classed L5pdg and L5pdb respectively.

The L5 was not as successful as the DD1 as the side rod electric locomotive concept proved to be unsuited to the demands of long distance electrification. Even in the existing short haul service the L5's long rigid wheelbase and poor weight distribution caused it to be withdrawn significantly before the older DD1s.
