= FF1 (disambiguation) =

FF1, or Final Fantasy (video game), is a video game and the first game in the Final Fantasy series

FF1 may refer to:

- Mozilla Firefox
- Fantastic Four (2005 Film), the first movie in the Fantastic Four series
- Fatal Frame (video game), the first game in the Fatal Frame series
- Final Fight (video game), the first game in the Final Fight series
- Fatal Fury: King of Fighters, the first game in the Fatal Fury series
- PRR FF1, a locomotive of the Pennsylvania Railroad
