= Layshaft =

Mechanism in car gearboxes

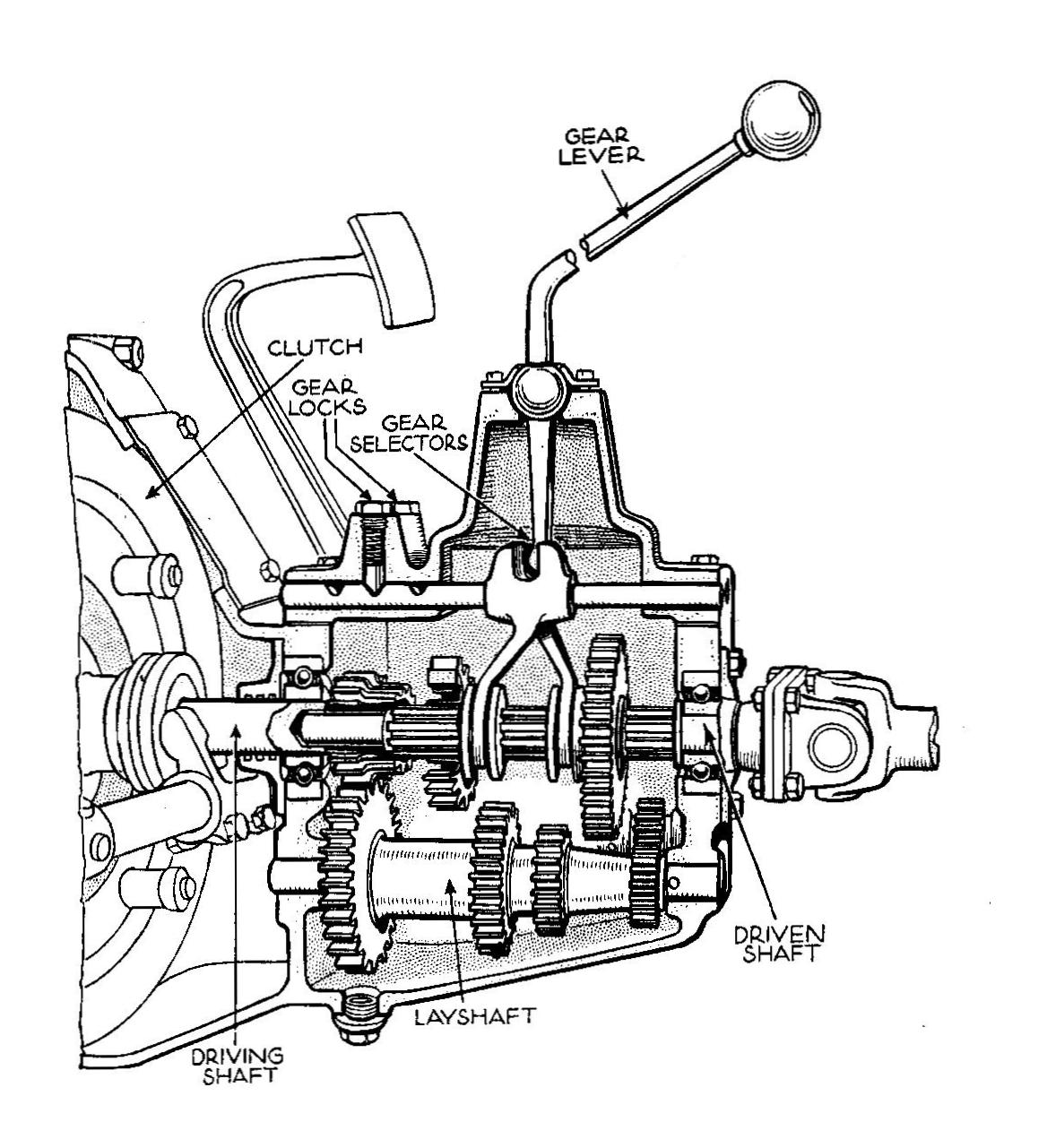
Sectioned 3-speed manual 'crash' gearbox, for a car c. 1935

A layshaft is an intermediate shaft within a gearbox that carries gears, but does not transfer the primary drive of the gearbox either in or out of the gearbox. Layshafts are best known through their use in car gearboxes, where they were a ubiquitous part of the rear-wheel drive layout. With the shift to front-wheel drive, the use of layshafts is now rarer.

The driving shaft carries the input power into the gearbox. The driven shaft is the output shaft from the gearbox. In car gearboxes with layshafts, these two shafts emerge from opposite ends of the gearbox, which is convenient for RWD cars but may be a disadvantage for other layouts.

For gearboxes in general, gear clusters (Note: Pairs or more of gears, connected together.) mounted on a layshaft may either turn freely on a fixed shaft, or may be part of a shaft that then rotates in bearings. There may be multiple separate clusters on a shared shaft and these are allowed to turn freely relative to each other. (Note: Note that this is not the case where a single transmission path at multiple speeds, such as for car gearboxes, is needed. Car gearboxes use a layshaft with all its gears coupled together.)

== Origins ==
The term layshaft originates with watermill machinery. The layshaft is the gear-carrying shaft that links the wallower (the small spur gear driven at increased speed by the waterwheel) to any upright shafts that carry the millstones. The term, layshaft, was also used by millwrights, in both wind- and watermills, to refer to a shaft that drove secondary machinery such as sack hoists, rather than the main milling machinery.

The term layshaft was also applied to back-geared lathes. These were lathes with a slow-speed mechanism in addition to their usual belt drive. This used two gears on a layshaft behind the headstock, giving a double reduction gear.

== Car manual transmissions ==
In the typical manual gearbox for a RWD car, the driving shaft (input) is in-line with the driven shaft (output), but not permanently connected to it. A reduction gear on the driving shaft drives the layshaft. In car transmissions, the term countershaft is also used. A number of gears on the layshaft may then be connected, one at a time, to the driven shaft. Selecting each of these gears in turn gives the various ratios of the gearbox. All of these gear ratios are reduction gears, the engine speed being higher than the input speed to the final drive of the rear axle.

Early gearboxes used sliding gears to engage and disengage the drive. These were difficult to operate and also wore on the main working surfaces of the gears. An early improvement was to use separate dog clutches instead to engage gears, leaving the gears themselves in 'constant mesh'. A later, and more gradual development, was the introduction of synchromesh. This is an all-metal friction clutch in addition to the positive dog clutch, that gradually engages the gears and matches their speed before the dog clutch engages.

The top gear of the gearbox is achieved without these gears, but by coupling the driven shaft directly to the driving shaft through another dog clutch. This gives a 'direct drive' top gear, which has advantages for both efficiency and quietness at cruising speed. A typical gearbox had 2% losses in each gear set, so 4% for intermediate ranges through their two gears, but approaching 0% for the direct-drive top gear. As the direct top gear is not transmitting torque through the gears, it is also quieter.

In theory, it is also possible to provide an overdrive top gear, another indirect gear, but of a speed-up ratio rather than the reduction ratio of the other gears. The direct-drive ratio then becomes the second-to-top or third gear. This arrangement was used on some early cars, but was uncommon. Where overdrive is provided for a RWD car, this was sometimes done by adding a separate overdrive gearbox to the output driven shaft of the gearbox, usually outside the gear casing.

Because of the layout of the gearbox, the layshaft is normally mounted low-down in the gearbox casing below the other shafts. The gear lever enters through the top of the casing and so it is more convenient for the sliding components of the dog clutches to be mounted on the driven shaft, rather than the layshaft. The layshaft gear cluster is thus often a simple one-piece component, typically cast iron gears running in bearings on a fixed steel shaft. The bearings may be plain phosphor bronze bushes, or for high-load applications needle rollers.

Where large numbers of gear ratios, six or more, are to be provided then these will require a third or more gear clusters on the layshaft. (Note: As top gear is direct-drive, even five gears only require two clusters.) To maintain the proportions of the overall gearbox as more compact, rather than becoming long and thin, these gearboxes may use twin layshafts. This requires an additional driven gear for each layshaft, but the mechanism is otherwise very similar. The use of multiple layshafts also developed into the multiple clutch gearbox, used for some buses, where each ratio has its own layshaft and separate plate or hydraulic clutches, rather than dog clutches, are used to select between them.

Where a power take-off is required, usually for industrial vehicles to drive winches, hydraulic pumps etc., this is often driven from one end of the layshaft, as this is more accessible shaft than the main shafts, already in use by the drivetrain.

=== 'All-indirect' gearboxes ===
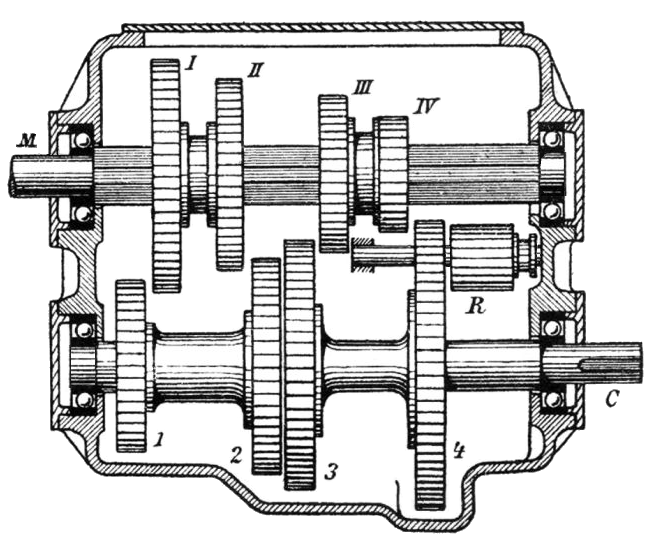
Early, pre-1911, all-indirect gearbox

Some gearboxes do not use a layshaft, but rely on indirect gears throughout. Output power is taken from the second shaft, which would otherwise be the layshaft.

All-indirect were used for some very early cars, before the advantages of the direct-drive top gear were recognised. They contain no dog clutches; at the time, gear changing was still carried out by sliding the gears in and out of mesh. Once the dog clutch came into use, the further advantage of a direct-drive top gear was immediately recognised.

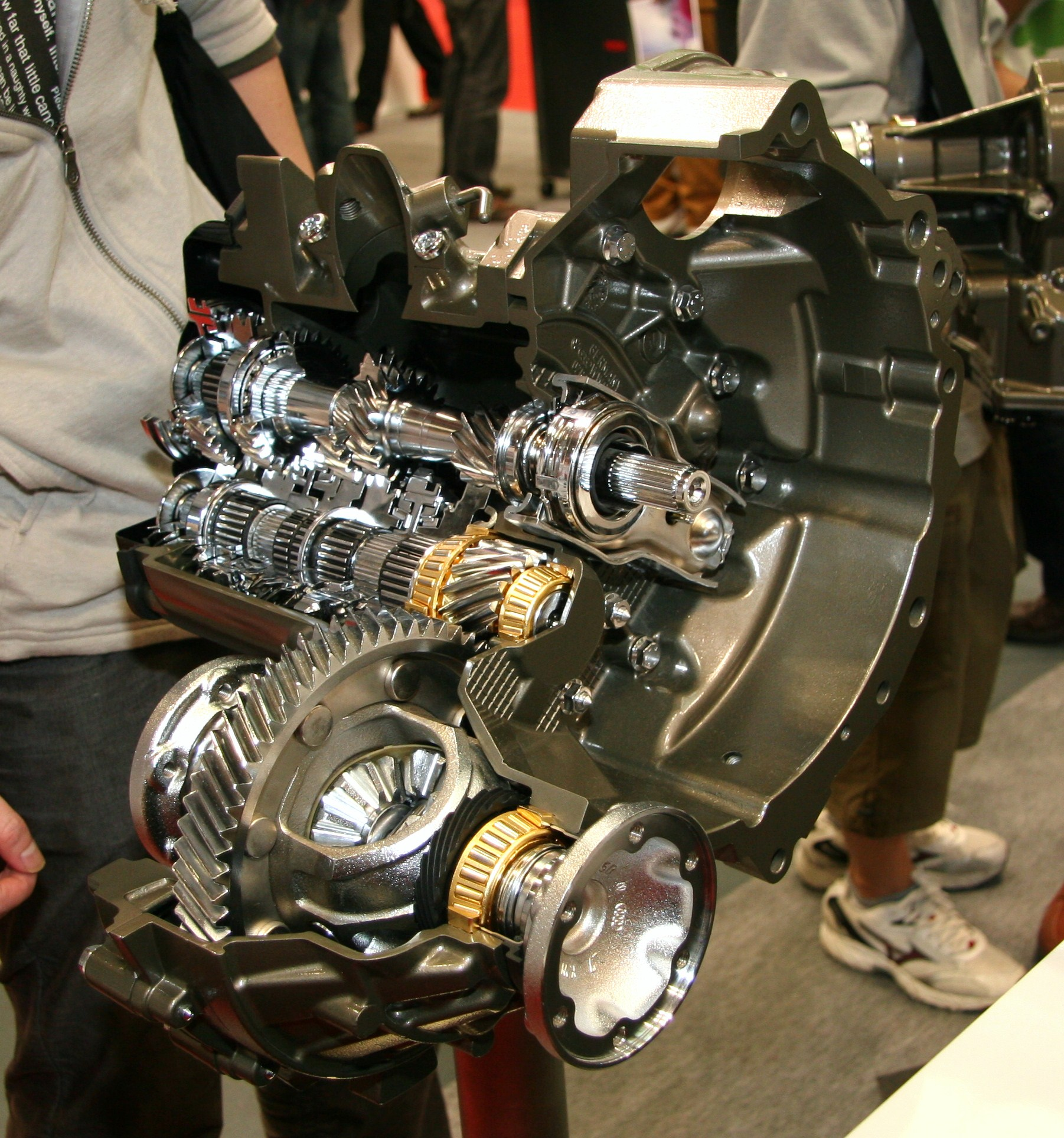
FWD all-indirect manual gearbox, with final drive taken from the second shaft

With the popularity of front-wheel drive from the 1960s, the all-indirect gearbox has become common. These have been used for both transverse engine layouts, where the offset of two shafts is more convenient than the in-line arrangement of a layshaft gearbox, and for longitudinal transaxle designs, such as the VW Beetle or many Renaults, (Note: Including the Renault 4, 5, 12, 16, 15/17, 25 & 30) where the requirement was to have both driven and driving shafts at the same end of the gearbox.

Although the loss of the direct-drive top ratio loses the ability for 0% losses when cruising, this is compensated for by reducing losses in other ratios from 4% to 2%. (Note: Through one gear pair rather than two.) Noise is also reduced by modern metallurgy and gear cutting, which give quieter and more efficient gear profiles.

As the gearbox efficiency remains constant for all ratios of an all-indirect gearbox, it is now convenient to provide overdrive top gears, even when these are no longer direct-drive or 1:1 ratios. One of the first mass-market cars to offer such a feature was the VW Polo and the Formel E, with a deliberately-labelled '-E' for 'economy' overdrive ratio.

== See also ==
- Jackshaft
