= Pennsylvania Railroad class FF1 =

Class of 1 American electric locomotive

PRR FF1
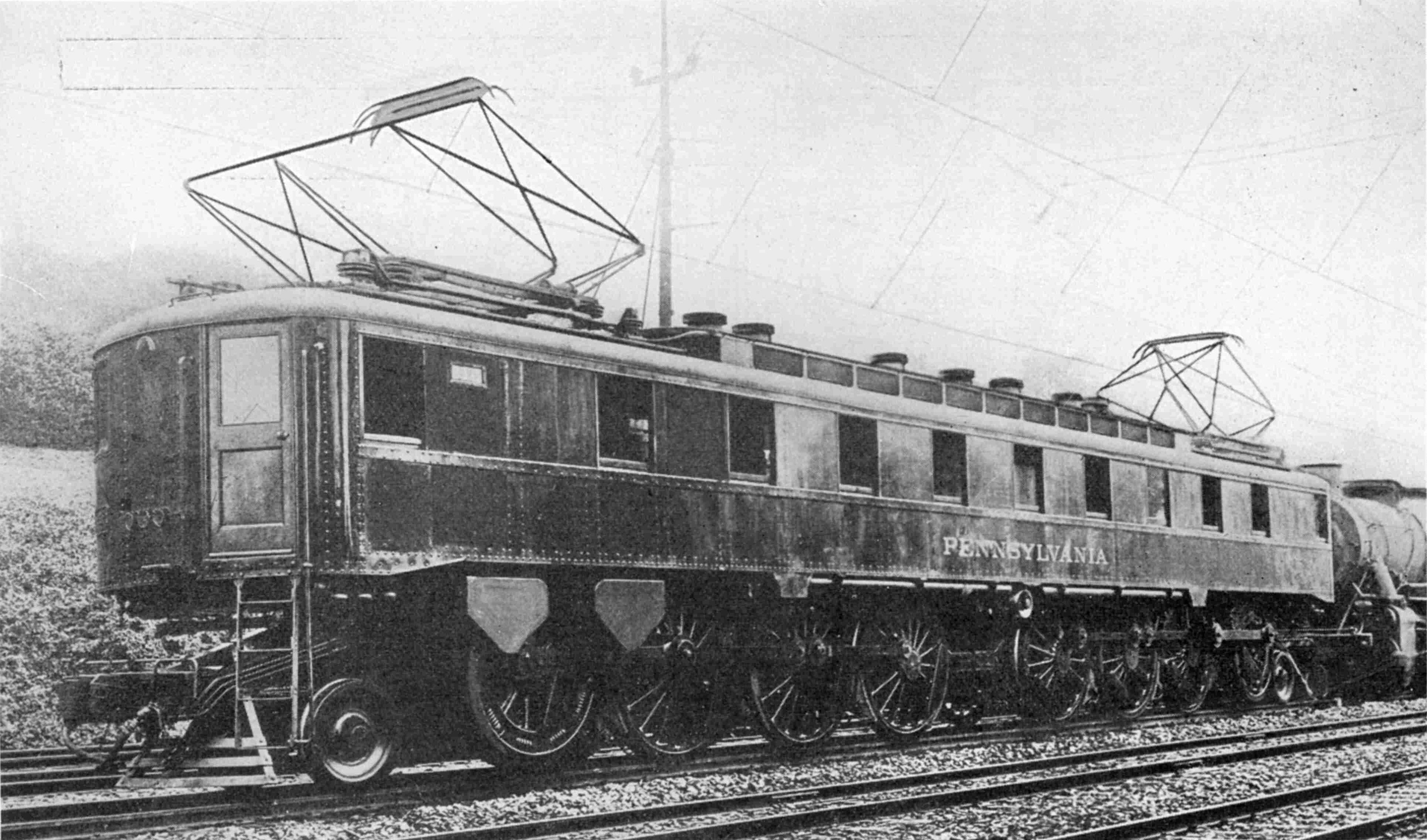
Type and origin
- Power type: Electric
- Builder: Altoona Works with Westinghouse
- Build date: 1917
- Total produced: 1
Specifications
- Configuration
  - Whyte: 2-6-0+0-6-2OE
  - AAR: 1-C+C-1
  - UIC: (1’C)(C1’)
- Gauge: 4 ft 8 1/2 in (1,435 mm) standard gauge
- Leading dia.: 36 in (914 mm)
- Driver dia.: 72 in (1,829 mm)
- Length: 76 ft 6 in (23.32 m)
- Height: 14 ft 8 in (4.47 m)
- Adhesive weight: 439,500 lb (199,400 kg; 199.4 t)
- Loco weight: 516,000 lb (234,100 kg; 234.1 t)
- Electric system/s: 11 kV 25 Hz AC Catenary
- Current pickup: Pantograph
- Traction motors: 4× Westinghouse Model 451 3-phase motors
  - Continuous: 1,910 hp (1,420 kW)
- Transmission: Rotary converter supplied 25 Hz three phase alternating current fed to motors able to run at one of two speeds and connected to the drivers through Jackshafts and side rods
Performance figures
- Maximum speed: 20.6 mph (33.2 km/h)
- Power output
  - Starting: 4,600 hp (3,430 kW)
  - Continuous: 4,000 hp (2,980 kW)
- Tractive effort
  - Starting: 140,000 lbf (623 kN)
  - Continuous: 87,200 lbf (388 kN)
Career
- Operators: Pennsylvania Railroad
- Class: FF-1
- Number in class: 1
- Numbers: 3931
- Nicknames: Big Liz
- Retired: 1940
- Disposition: Scrapped

The Pennsylvania Railroad's class FF1 was an American electric locomotive, a prototype numbered #3931 and nicknamed "Big Liz". It was built in 1917 to haul freight trains across the Allegheny Mountains where the PRR planned to electrify. "Big Liz" proved workable but too powerful for the freight cars of the time with its 4,600 hp (3,400 kW) and 140,000 lbf (620 kN) of tractive effort. Pulling the train it regularly snapped couplers and when moved to the rear as a pusher its force was sufficient to pop cars in the middle of the train off the tracks.

== Design ==
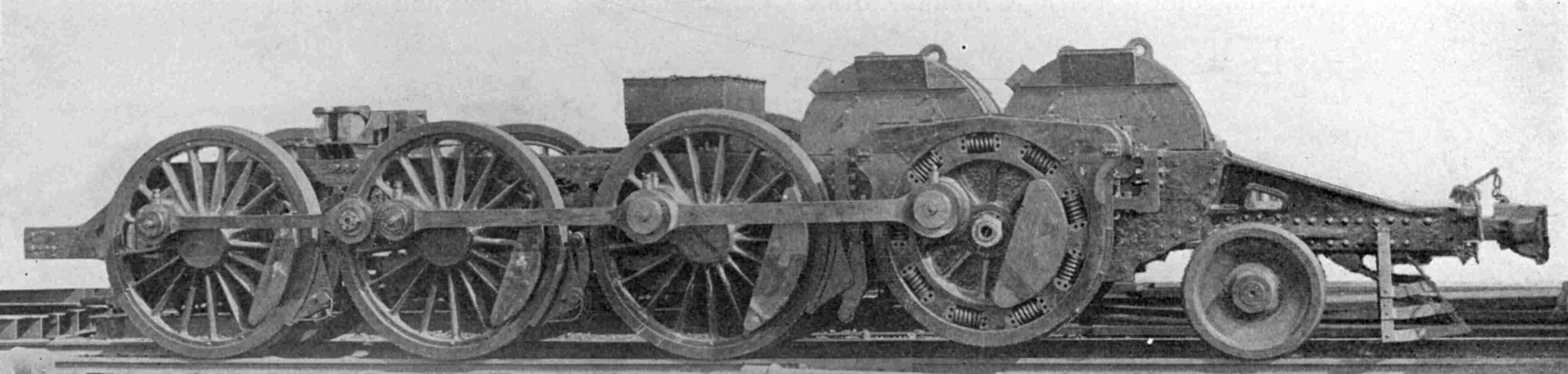
Detail of PRR FF1 truck.

It had a 2-6-6-2 wheel arrangement in two half-frames, connected in the center. Each frame had a pair of three-phase AC induction motors driving a jackshaft through gearing and a spring drive; side rods then drove the wheels. The jackshafts can be mistaken for an additional fourth axle but the "wheels" are cogwheels to transfer power from the motors to the jackshaft. Three-phase power for the four massive motors was supplied from the single phase overhead supply via a large rotary converter housed in the body of the locomotive. Combined rated output of the motors was 7,640 hp (5,700 kW), but the converter could only supply a short term 4,600 hp (3,400 kW) or a continuous 4,000 hp (3,000 kW). With three-phase induction motors there was no way to control the speed of the motors; changing the wiring of the motor poles allowed for two speed settings, 10.3 and 20.6 mph (16.6 and 33.2 km/h), which were considered enough to drag heavy freight trains up and down steep grades.

== History ==
Its intended use as an Allegheny climber was never realized and its power was too much for the rolling stock in service at the time. Big Liz was sidelined until being cut up for scrap in 1940.
