= Jackshaft (locomotive) =

Locomotive part

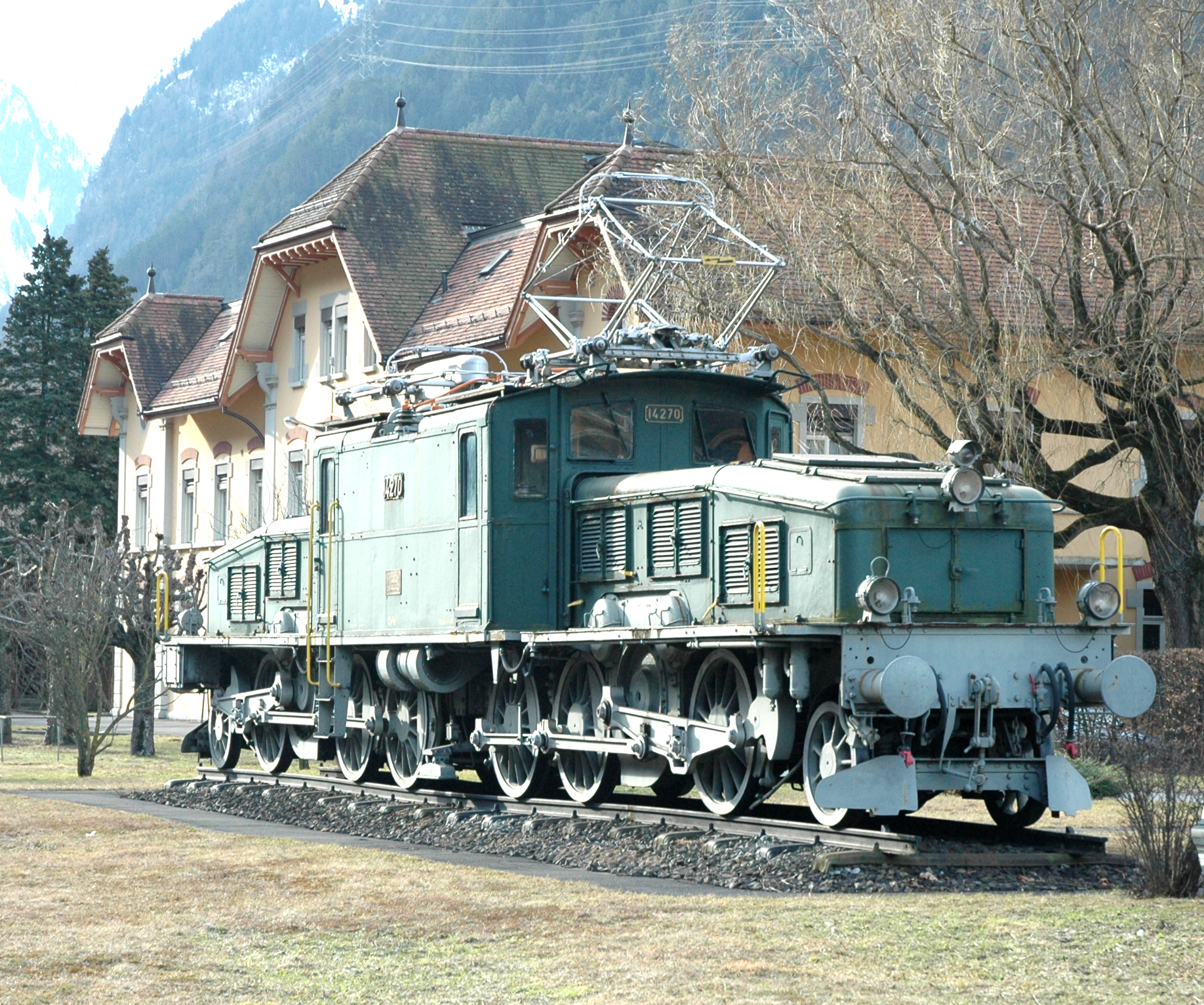
A Crocodile of the Swiss Federal Railways. Each set of 6 driving wheels is driven by a jackshaft between the driving wheels, gear-driven by a pair of traction motors.

A jackshaft is an intermediate shaft used to transfer power from a powered shaft such as the output shaft of an engine or motor to driven shafts such as the drive axles of a locomotive. As applied to railroad locomotives in the 19th and 20th centuries, jackshafts were typically in line with the drive axles of locomotives and connected to them by side rods. In general, each drive axle on a locomotive is free to move about one inch (2.5 cm) vertically relative to the frame, with the locomotive weight carried on springs. This means that if the engine, motor or transmission is rigidly attached to the locomotive frame, it cannot be rigidly connected to the axle. This problem can be solved by mounting the jackshaft on unsprung bearings and using side-rods or (in some early examples) chain drives.

Jackshafts were first used in early steam locomotives, although the designers did not yet call them by that name. In the early 20th century, large numbers of jackshaft-driven electric locomotives were built for heavy mainline service. Jackshaft drives were also used in many early gasoline and diesel locomotives that used mechanical transmissions.

== Steam locomotives ==
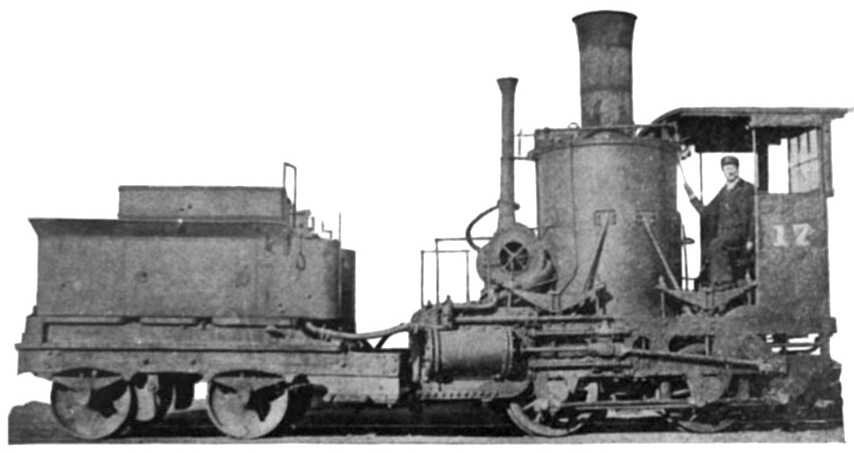
A Baltimore and Ohio Crab. The crankshaft is directly below the cab at the front of the engine, geared to the jackshaft, which is coupled to the driving axles by side rods.

The Baltimore and Ohio Railroad was a pioneer in the use of jackshaft driven locomotives. While the drive axle of the first Grasshopper locomotive was directly driven by spur gears from the crankshaft, the Traveler delivered in 1833, used a jackshaft, as did all the later Grasshopper and Crab locomotives. These locomotives used step-up gearing to achieve a reasonable running speed using small diameter driving wheels. It is notable that the term jackshaft was not used by the designers of these machines. Instead, they referred to what would later be called a jackshaft as "a separate axle, about three feet forward of the front axle, and carrying cranks coupled by connecting rods to cranks on the two road axles." In his 1837 patent for what became known as the crab class of locomotives, Ross Winans referred to his jackshaft as "a pinion wheel shaft", or "third axle."

In a conventional steam locomotive, the crankshaft is one of the driving axles. In a jackshaft-driven steam locomotive, the crankshaft turns a jackshaft which, in turn, turns the driver. Some steam locomotives have had designs intermediate between these extremes, with crankshafts distinct from the driving axle. Phineas Davis's first B&O Grasshopper tested on the B&O in 1831 was in this class, as was the Stockton and Darlington Railway's Swift from 1836, where the crankshaft was directly between the driving axles. Both of these examples used vertical cylinders, with the crankshaft in the plane of the driving axles. The former used a geared drive to the first driving axle, the latter used side rods for this linkage. In the latter case, the reason inferred for using a crankshaft distinct from the driven axles was "to take the shocks of working away from the power shaft."

Several locomotives have been built with horizontal cylinders driving a crankshaft directly above the rear driving axle, with a common spring supporting both the shaft and axle so that they could move vertically together. Ross Winans designed a series of 0-8-0 locomotives starting in 1842, launching what became the B&O Mud Digger class of engines. Like the Grasshopper locomotives before them, the crank shafts on these engines were geared to the driven shafts. In his 1843 patent, Winas referred to the crankshaft as a fifth shaft, or axle. In 1880, the Fowler Steam Plough Works of Leeds England received a patent on a similar 0-4-0 locomotive design with vertical side rods between the crankshaft and rear axle. Here, the motivation was to get the cylinders and piston rods up away from dust and dirt on an engine with diminutive drive wheels. One such Fowler locomotive survives, a very small narrow-gauge 0-4-2T.

Early designers of steam turbine locomotives did not understand the need for reduction gearing or sprung suspensions. Once these problems were understood, jackshafts emerged as one alternative for linking the output gearbox of the turbine to the driving wheels. Giuseppe Belluzzo, of Italy, was granted several US patents on variations of this idea. Alternatives to jackshaft drives included use of a quill drive with the turbine above the drive axle, or a combination of a quill drive with a gearbox suspended horizontally between a locomotive driving axle and the turbine shaft.

== Electric locomotives ==
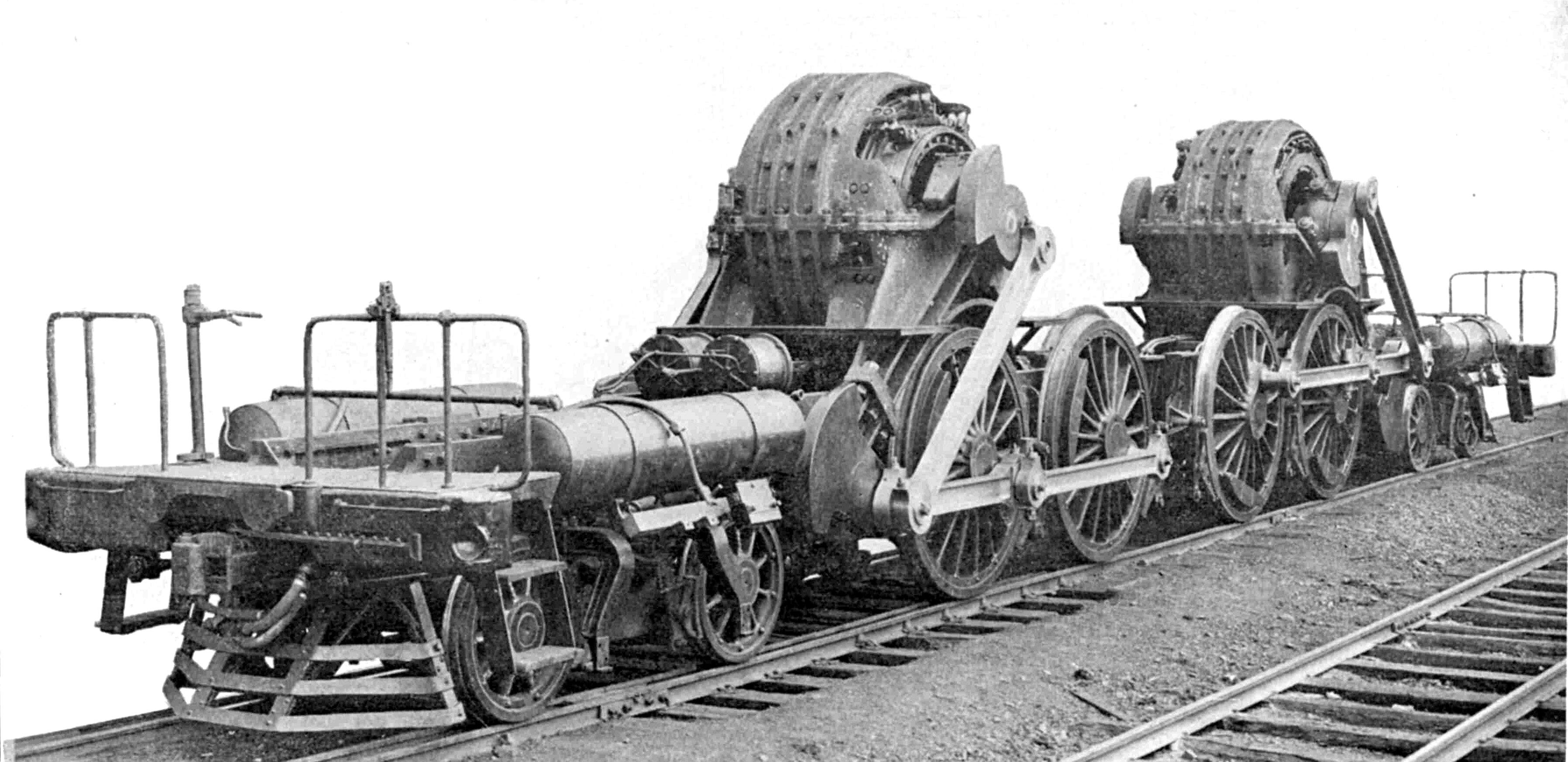
The running gear of a PRR DD1. The jackshafts, and the large electric motors that made them necessary, are clearly visible.

Many early electric locomotives were also equipped with jackshafts. A general survey of electric locomotive design from 1915 shows 15 distinct jackshaft-drive arrangements out of 24 distinct locomotive designs.

Some early locomotives used small diameter DC traction motors mounted on individual axles, but the majority, especially for AC powered locomotives, had only one or two large diameter motors. These large diameter motors were larger than most driving wheels and so were mounted well above the level of the driving axles. The motor or motors drove the jackshaft or jackshafts through gears or side rods, and then the jackshaft turned the wheels through side rods. In Europe, Oerlikon and Brown, Boveri pioneered a variety of jackshaft designs, while in the United States, Westinghouse was dominant. The early surveys of electric locomotive designs cited here all use the term jackshaft or jack-shaft.

Examples include the PRR DD1 and FF1 electric locomotives, as well as the Swiss Class Ce 6/8 Crocodile and its narrow-gauge cousin, the Rhaetian Railway Ge 6/6 I.

Continuing development of electric motors made them smaller, and by World War II, most new and made jackshafts obsolete.

== Internal combustion locomotives ==
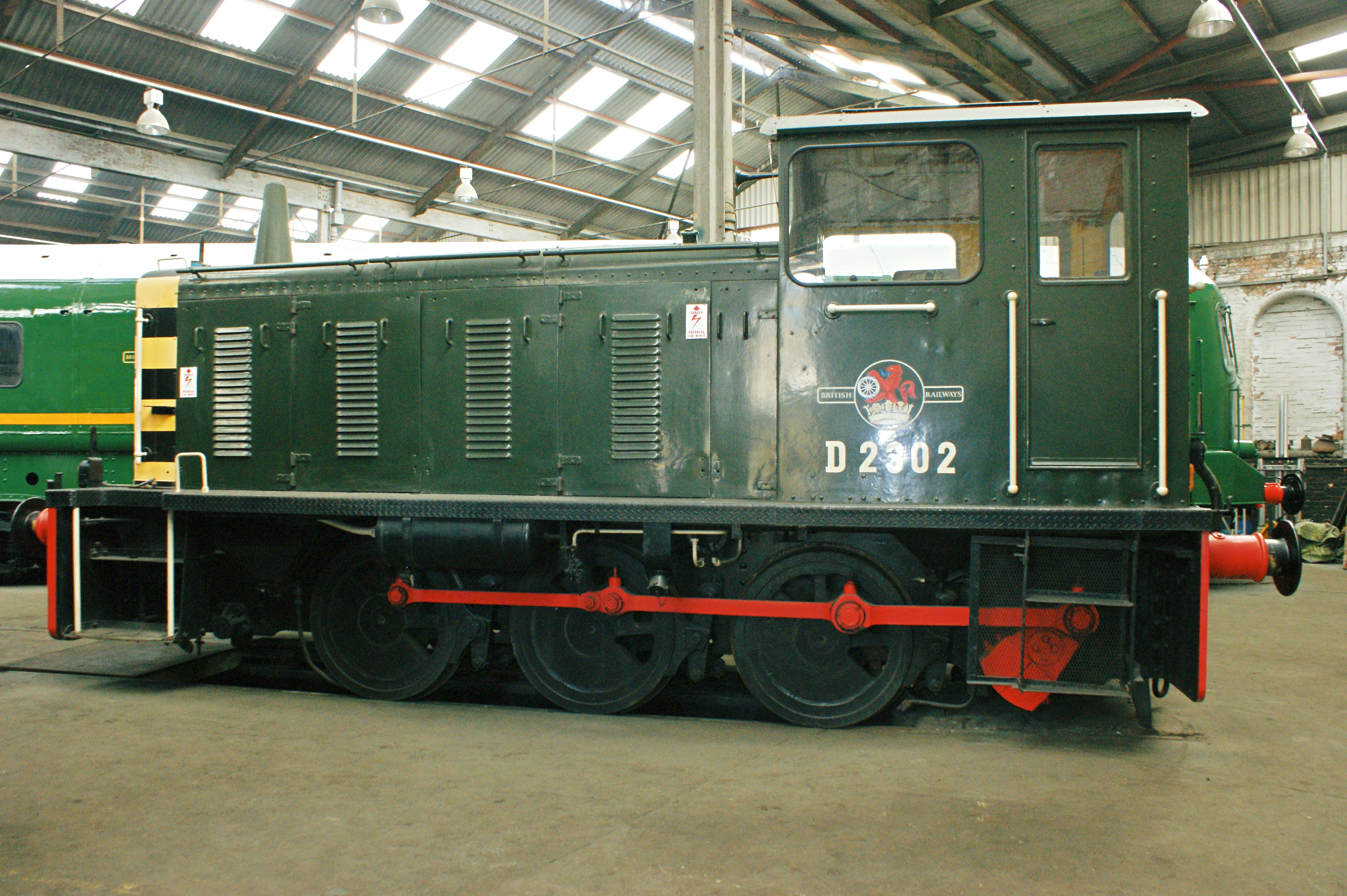
A British Rail Class 03 shunter

When Baldwin first began building internal combustion locomotives in the first decades of the 20th century, they used a 2-speed transmission from the gasoline engine to a jackshaft. Baldwin's early internal combustion locomotive patents covered the use of both side rods and chain drive to link the jackshaft to the driving wheels. The first Baldwin internal-combustion locomotives used an 0-4-0 configuration and weighed from 3.5 to 9 tons, but by 1919, a 25-ton 0-6-0 configuration was available. These locomotives saw extensive service on the narrow gauge trench railways of World War I.

The British Rail Class 03 diesel (pictured) and Finnish State Railways Dv15 are more recent examples. Jackshafts were used on some diesel-mechanical and diesel-hydraulic locomotives but were seldom used on diesel-electrics. One exception was the British Rail Class D3/7.

== Suspension movement ==
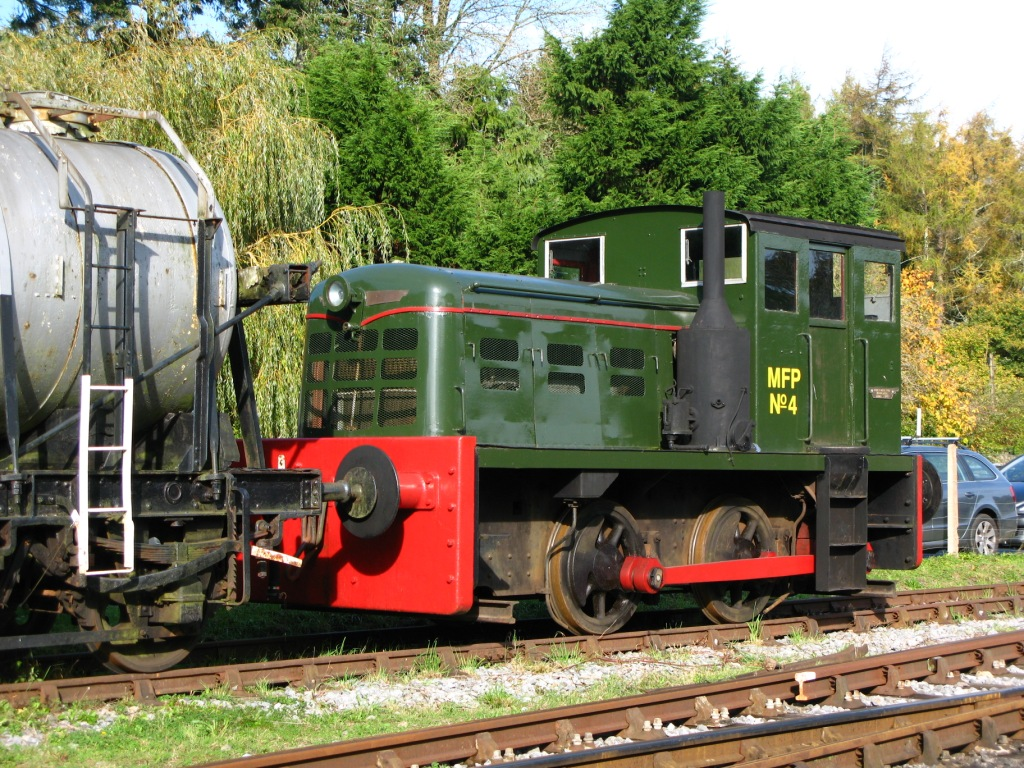
Small Fowler 4wDM diesel-mechanical. Note how the jackshaft coupling rods take the longer path to the far axle, reducing angulation.

A difficulty with coupling rod drive from a jackshaft is the need to allow for vertical suspension movement of the axles. Several mechanical arrangements have been used to allow this.

=== Long horizontal rods ===
The simplest arrangement is to use long coupling rods, running horizontally. A large vertical movement at the wheel end gives rise to only a small horizontal movement at the jackshaft drive. For a diesel-mechanical locomotive this can be compensated for by horizontally compliant mounting of the transmission. The heavy engine is carried over the drive wheels for adhesive weight, but the relatively lightweight gearbox can be mounted at one end, beyond the coupled wheelbase. A final drive casing is also narrow enough to mount between the frames, allowing it to be mounted low down and level with the driving axles.

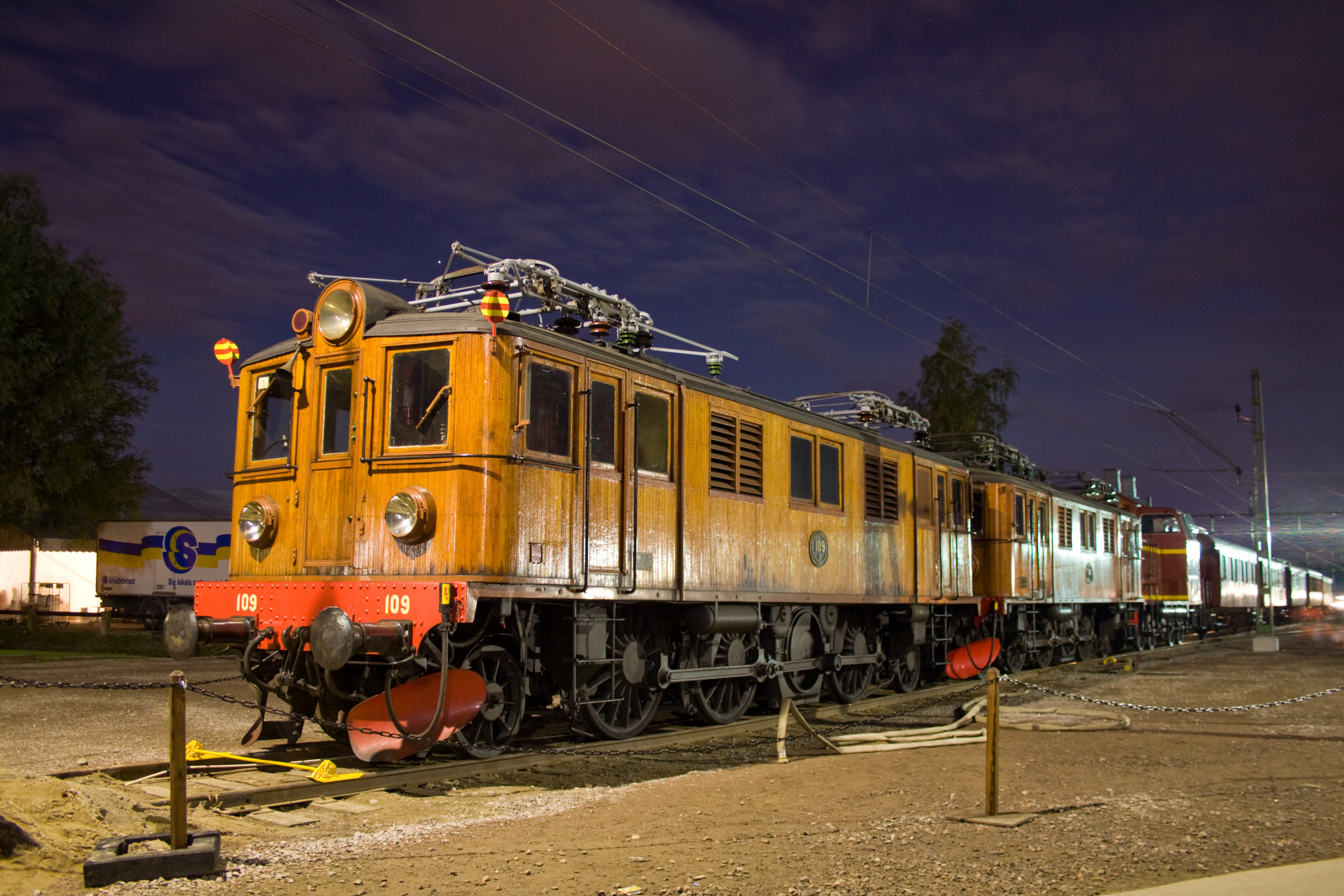
Swedish Statens Järnvägar Du class 1-C-1

This arrangement is common for slow speed diesel shunters, but not usually for main line speeds. The Swedish D-lok of 1925 did use it, with two motors geared to a single jackshaft with short rods between two driving axles of a 1-C-1 layout.

=== Slotted rods ===
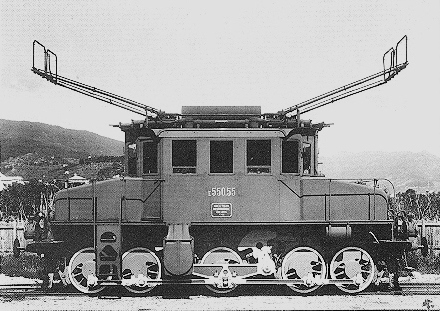
E550

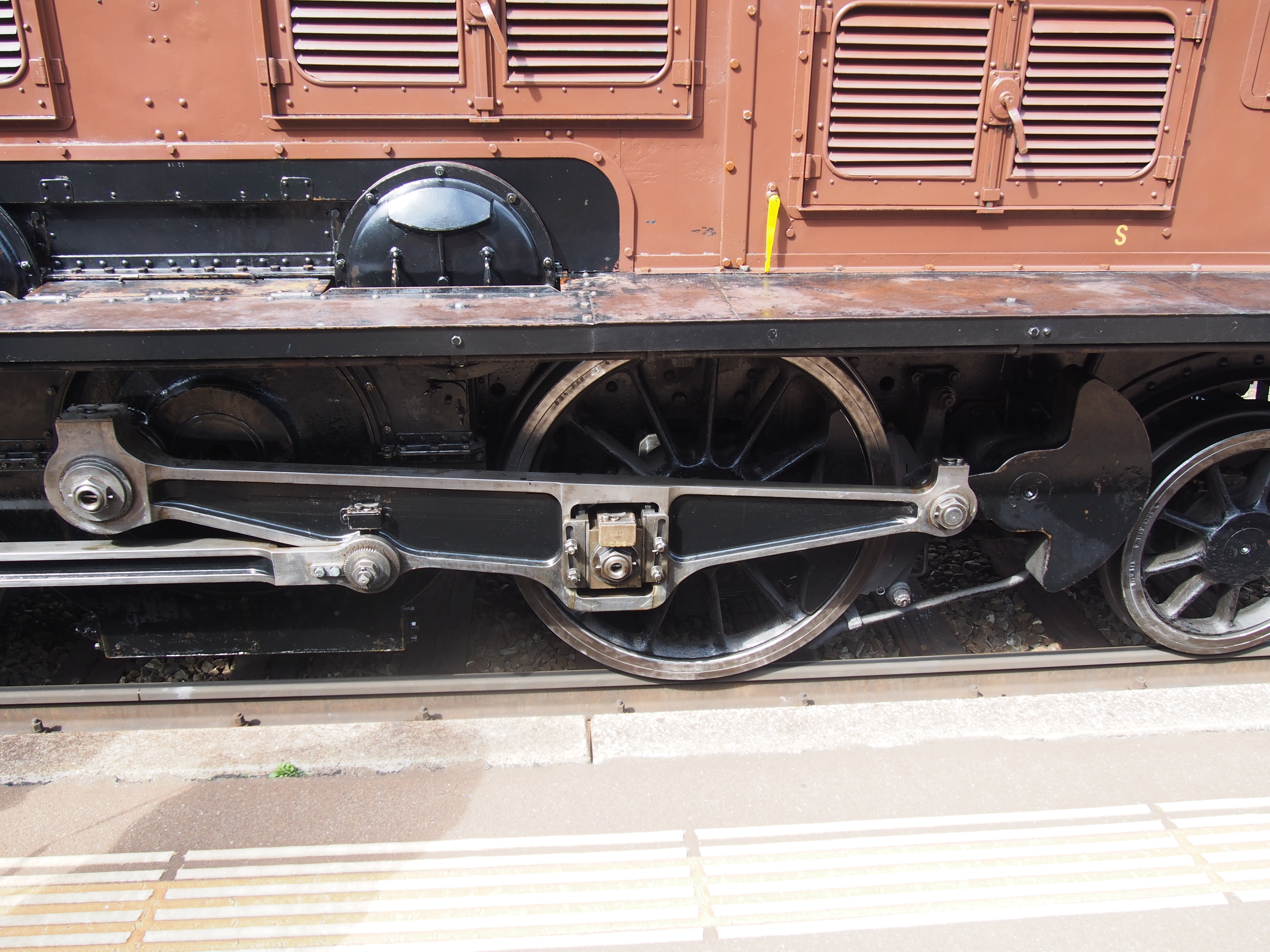
SBB Ce 6-8^{II} with slotted rods

Vertical sliding bearings in hornblocks would allow movement, but these must be designed carefully or else the force exerted through the rods would be wasted in simply sliding this bearing back and forth. Such sliding joints must be arranged to allow suspension travel, but so that the rod force is always at right angles to the slideway.

The ten-coupled Italian E550 of 1908 had paired motors, each with a jackshaft. A triangular rod was carried between these, rotating in synchrony and so always horizontal. This carried a sliding crankpin journal for the centre axle, and bearings for the long coupling rods to the unevenly-spaced pairs of drivers ahead and behind. A similar arrangement was used for the Swiss Bern–Lötschberg–Simplon railway Be 5/7 1-E-1 of 1912.

Conceptually similar linkages were used for the Swiss Ce 6/8^{II} crocodiles. As these had only a single traction motor at each end, the triangular frame was also carried by a blind, unpowered, jackshaft. It was slightly inclined, as the motor jackshaft was above the wheel axis.

=== Winterthur diagonal rods ===
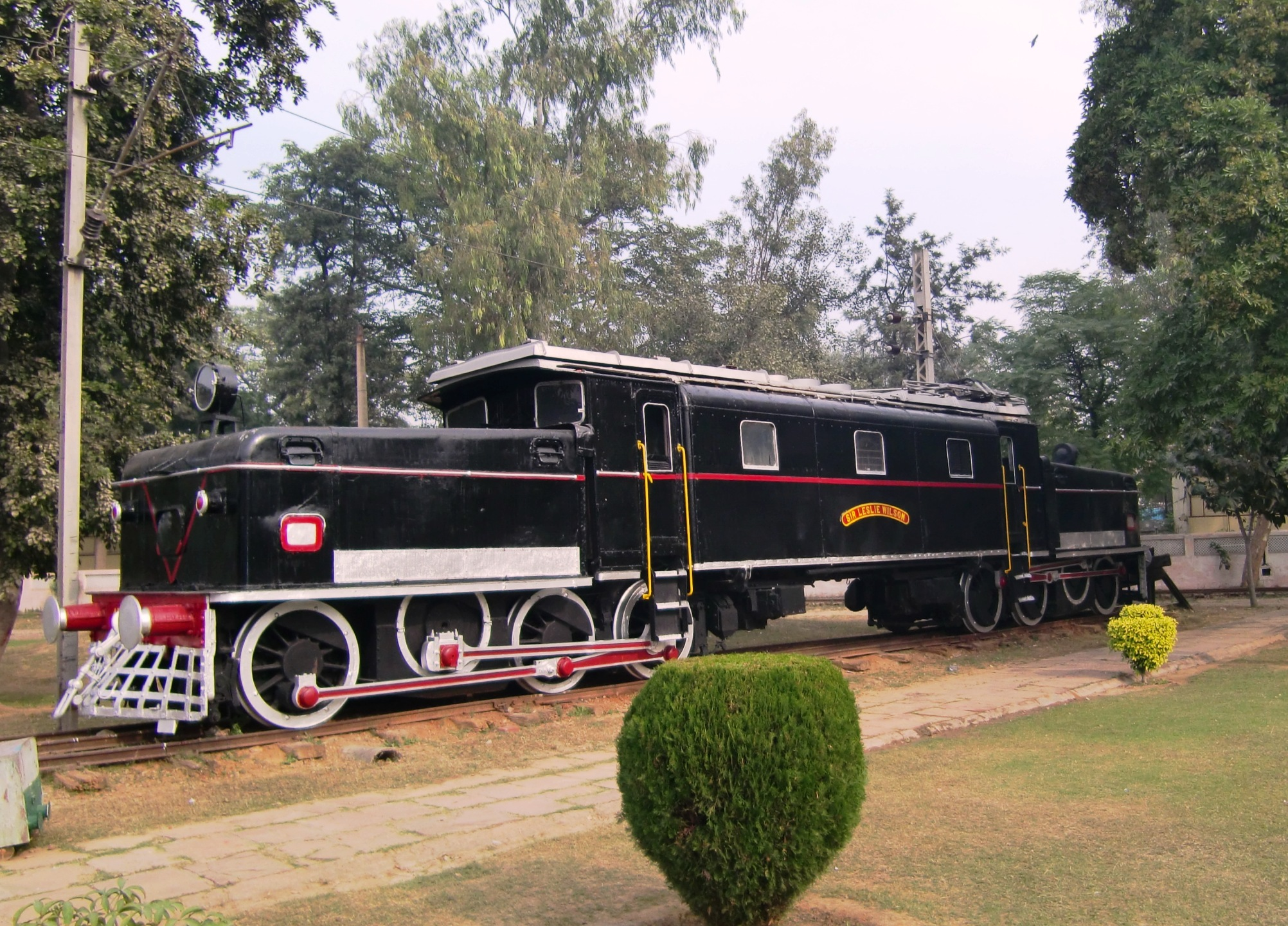
Swiss-built Indian WCG1 Crocodile

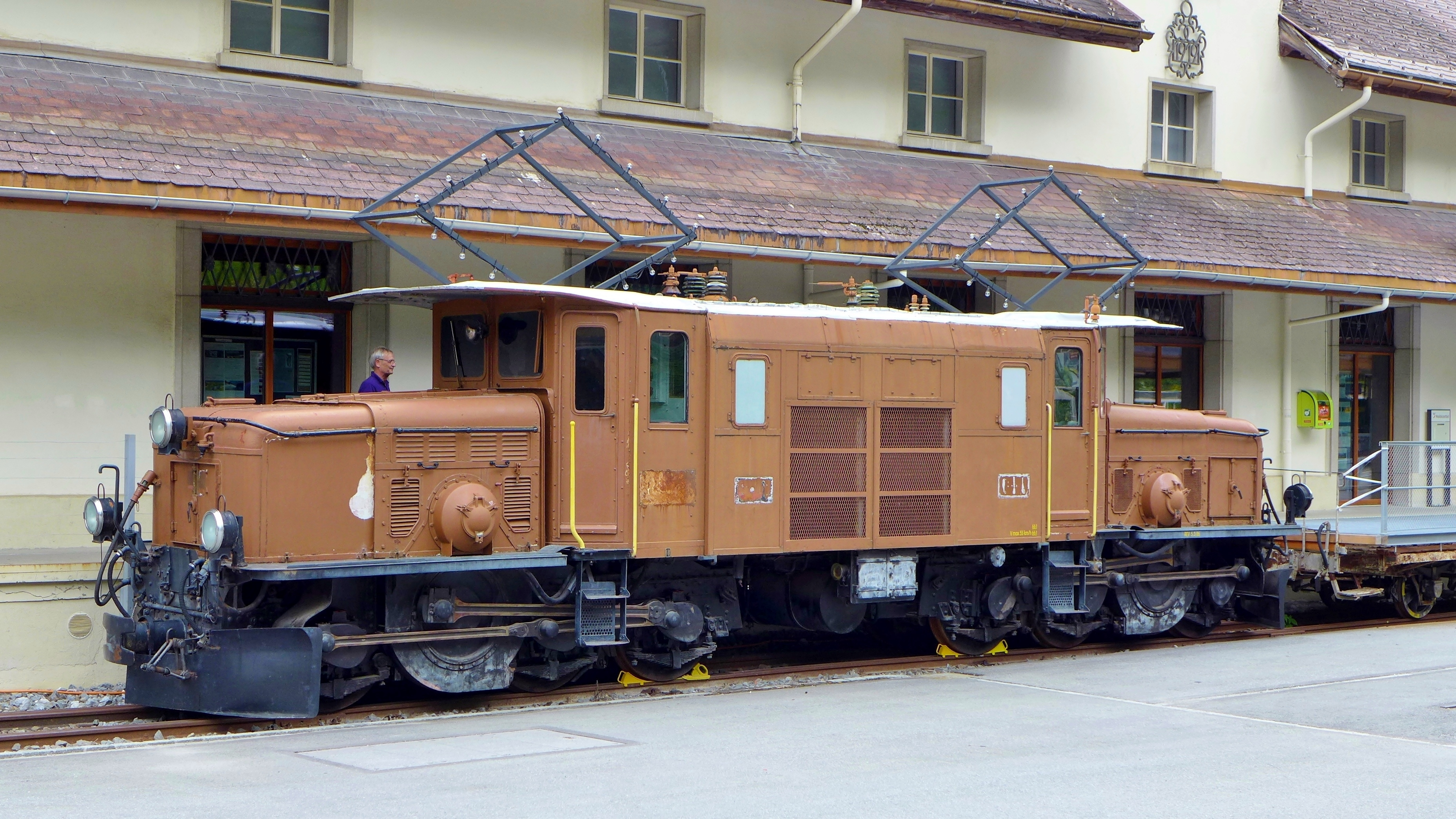
RhB Ge 6/6 ^{I} Crocodile

Most of the Swiss crocodile classes used the Winterthur diagonal rod or Schrägstangenantrieb (German) design instead.

These locomotives were articulated, with one large traction motor on each of the two bogies at each end. The jackshaft was thus placed above and between the driving wheels. To maximise the length of its drive rod and reduce its angulation, this was connected near to the furthest driven axle. The coupling rod between those axles was 'triangular', with an additional bearing mounted on its top edge, taking the thrust of the jackshaft drive rod. Unlike most connecting rods, this allows it to be mounted in the same plane as the coupling rod bearings. This reduces the overhung lengths of the crankpins and their bending loads.

This arrangement is simple and robust, but does not give a perfect geometry and so is known for its creaking noises and rough running, particularly if the rod bearings become worn. For the Swiss locomotives: well-maintained, powerful locomotives running at slow speeds over steep gradients, this was an acceptable design. It did not however make many inroads into fast passenger services.

=== Ganz and Kandó linkages ===
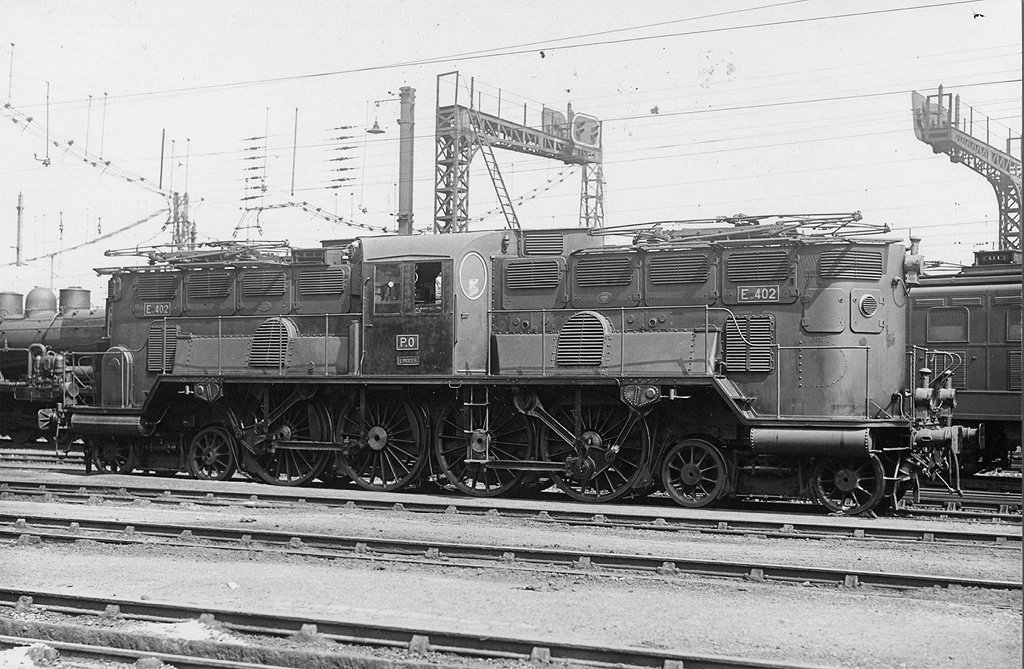
2BB2 400

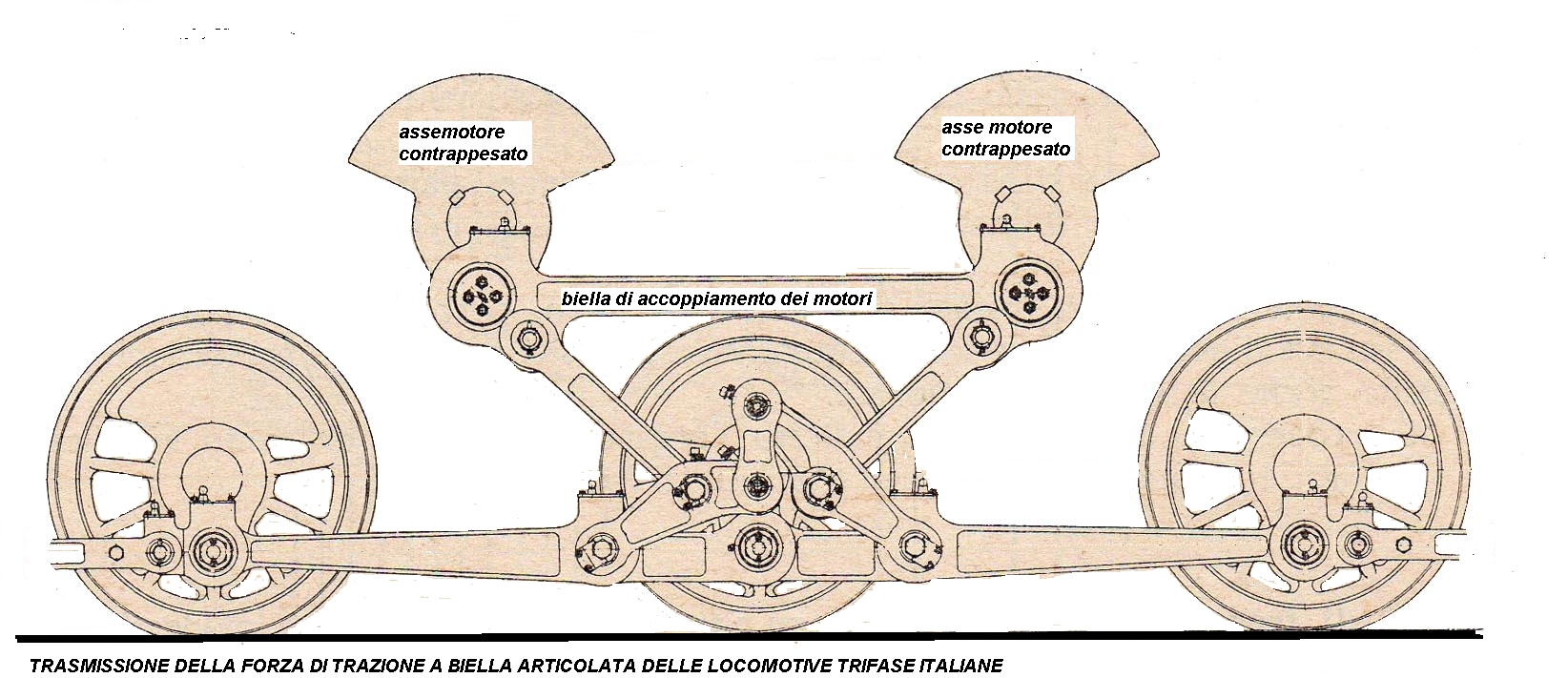
Bianchi linkage, used in Italy

Some of the more complicated linkages used for express locomotives were the Ganz, Kandó or Bianchi linkages. These were in the form of an inverted triangle, reaching down from the high-mounted motor jackshaft to the wheel axle line.

The Ganz form was used on the Hungarian-built Les Belles Hongroises 2BB2 400 locomotives for the French PO. This had four links forming the triangle, with the two upper vertices mounted to the locomotive frame (through a short swinging link) and to the jackshaft crankpin. The lower apex of the triangle contained a short triangular link, which linked the sides of the triangle to the wheel crankpin. By tilting this link, the suspension movement was absorbed. This linkage ran well at speed and as it was composed entirely of pivoting joints with no sliding, there was no lost motion. It was however complex, heavy and unbalanced.

The Kandó linkage was similar in compensation, but the upper vertices were carried by a pair of motor jackshafts.

The only one of these linkages with a widespread or long service life was the symmetrical, and better-balanced, Bianchi linkage, used in Italy.
