= Traction motor =

Electric motor for vehicle propulsion

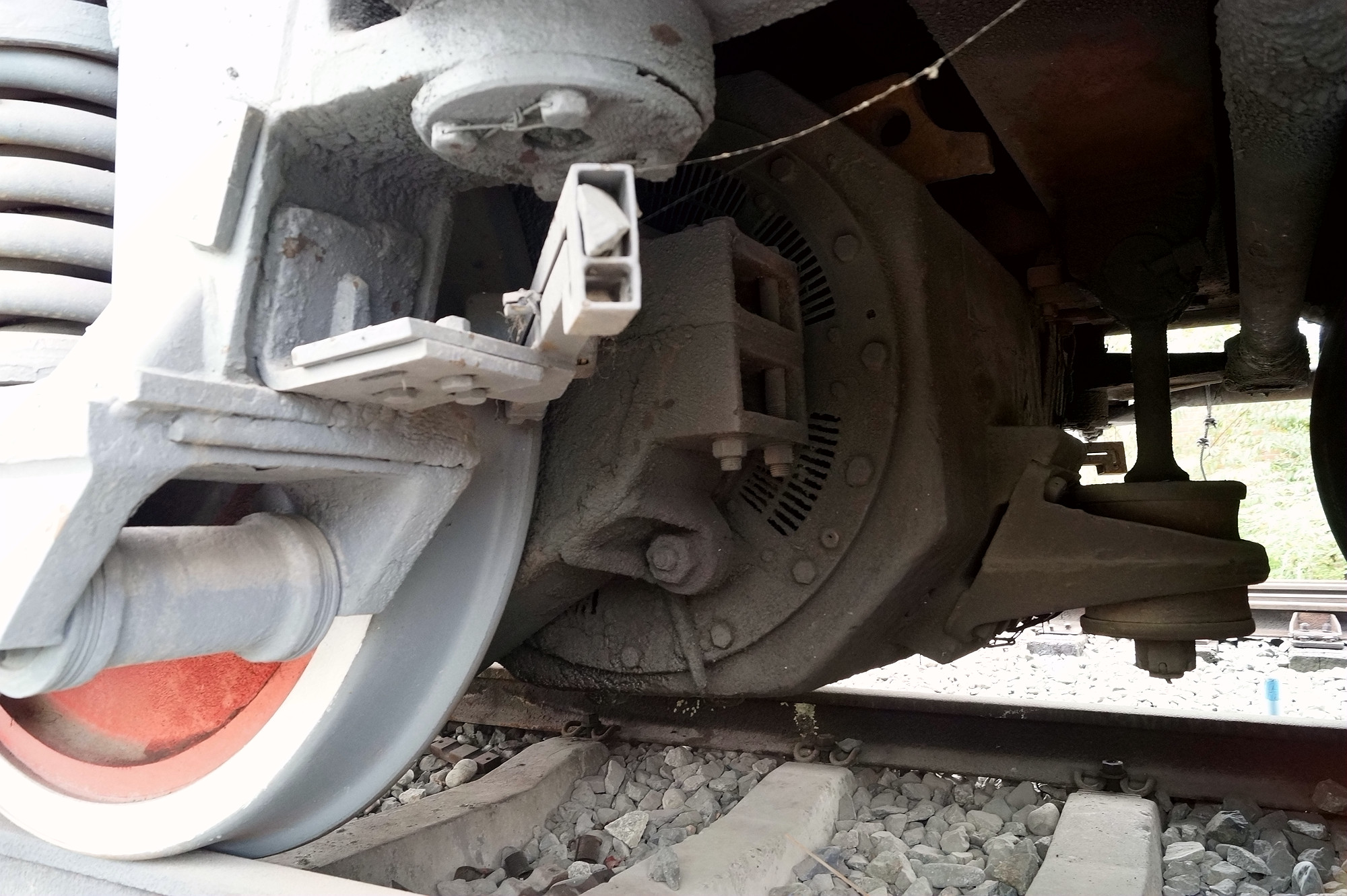
A ZQDR-410 traction motor (the large, dark component on the axle with small ventilation holes)

A traction motor is an electric motor used for propulsion of a vehicle, such as locomotives, electric or hydrogen vehicles, or electric multiple unit trains.

Traction motors are used in electrically powered railway vehicles (electric multiple units) and other electric vehicles, including electric milk floats, trolleybuses, elevators, roller coasters, and conveyor systems, as well as vehicles with electrical transmission systems (diesel–electric locomotives, electric hybrid vehicles), and battery electric vehicles.

== Etymology ==
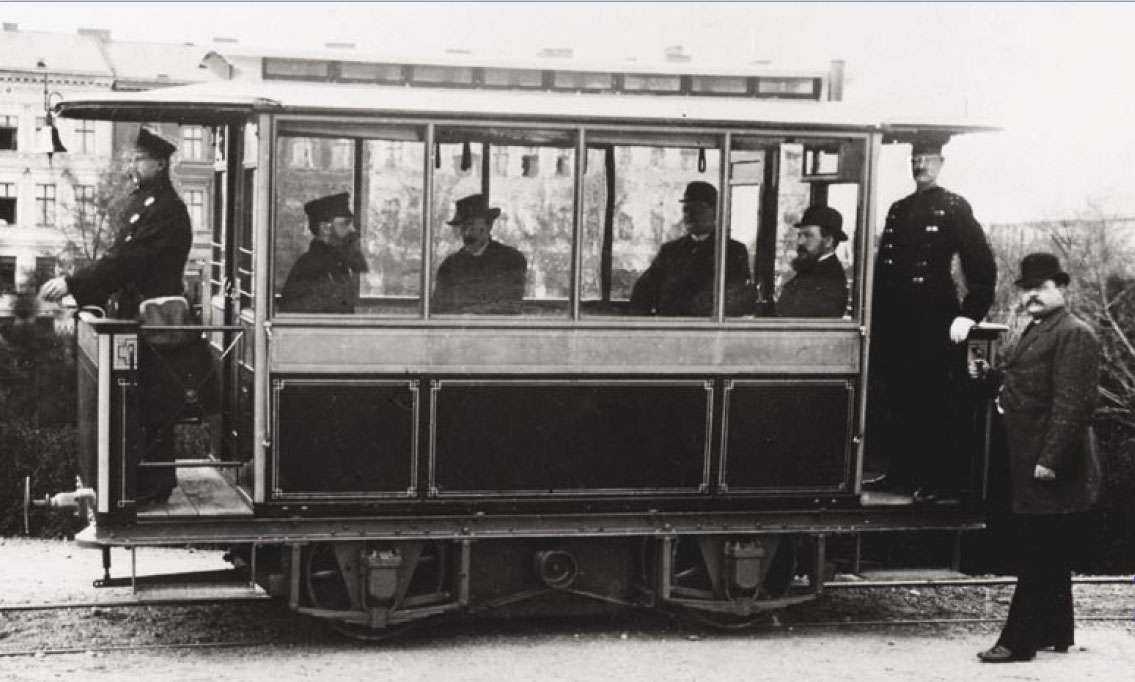
The Lichterfelde tram in Berlin, 1882

The word traction comes from the Latin trahere, "to pull", by way of its past participle tractus, and was applied to the traction engines developed around 1870.

The first experimental electric traction motor tramway appeared in 1875, and the technology was rapidly taken up for city use internationally. During the 19th century, companies running passenger cars driven by traction motors began to compete with the horse-drawn railways that dominated city transport.

== Motor types and control ==
Direct-current motors with series field windings are the oldest type of traction motors. These provide a speed-torque characteristic useful for propulsion, providing high torque at lower speeds for the acceleration of the vehicle, and declining torque as speed increases. By arranging the field winding with multiple taps, the speed characteristic can be varied, allowing relatively smooth operator control of acceleration. A further measure of control is provided by using pairs of motors on a vehicle in series-parallel control. For slow operation or heavy loads, two motors can be run in series across the direct-current supply. Where higher speed is desired, these motors can be operated in parallel, making a higher voltage available at each motor and so allowing higher speeds. Parts of a rail system might use different voltages, with higher voltages in long runs between stations and lower voltages near stations where only slower operation is needed.

A variant of the DC system is the AC series motor, also known as the universal motor, which is essentially the same device but operates on alternating current. Since both the armature and field current reverse at the same time, the behavior of the motor is similar to that when energized with direct current. To achieve better operating conditions, AC railways are often supplied with current at a lower frequency than the commercial supply used for general lighting and power; special traction current power stations are used, or rotary converters used to convert 50 or 60 Hz commercial power to the 25 Hz or 16 2/3 Hz frequency used for AC traction motors. Because it permits the simple use of transformers, the AC system allows efficient distribution of power down the length of a rail line, and also permits speed control with switchgear on the vehicle.

AC induction motors and synchronous motors are simple and low maintenance, but up until the advent of power semiconductors, were awkward to apply for traction motors because of their fixed speed characteristic. An AC induction motor generates useful amounts of power only over a narrow speed range, determined by its construction and the frequency of the AC power supply. The advent of power semiconductors has made it possible to fit a variable frequency drive on a locomotive; this allows a wide range of speeds, AC power transmission, and the use of rugged induction motors that do not have wearing parts like brushes and commutators.

== Transportation applications ==
=== Road vehicles ===
Traditionally, road vehicles (cars, buses, and trucks) have used diesel and petrol engines with a mechanical or hydraulic transmission system. In the latter part of the 20th century, vehicles with electrical transmission systems (powered by internal combustion engines, batteries, or fuel cells) began to be developed. One advantage of electric machines is that some types can recover energy by acting as a regenerative brake, which provides deceleration and increases overall efficiency by charging the battery pack.

=== Railways ===
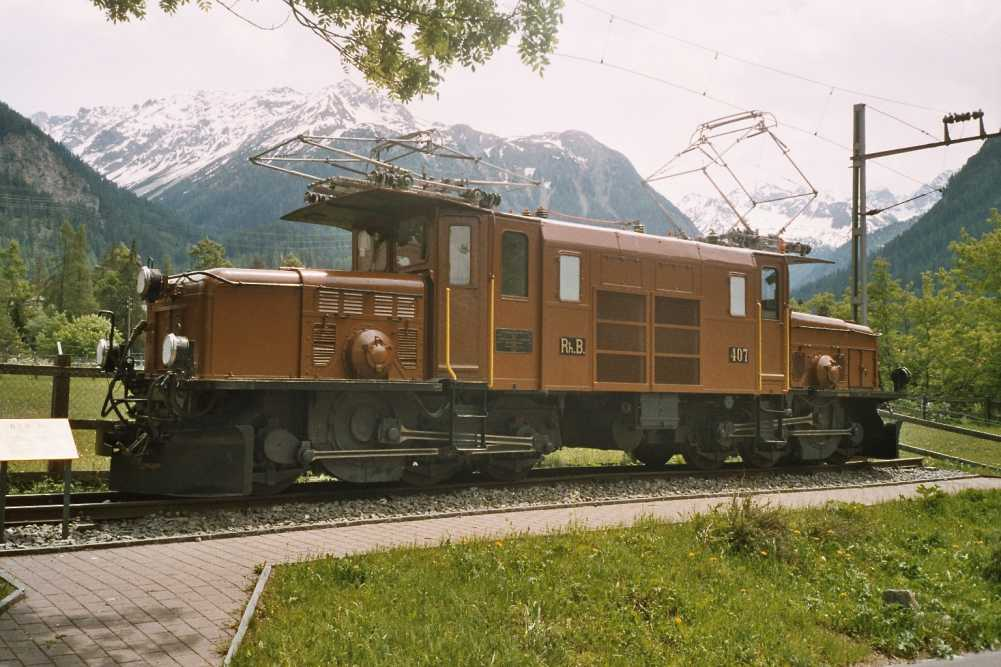
Swiss Rhaetian Railway Ge 6/6 I Krokodil locomotive, with a single large traction motor above each bogie, with drive by coupling rods

Traditionally, these were series-wound brushed DC motors, usually running on approximately 600 volts. The availability of high-powered semiconductors (thyristors and the IGBT) has now made practical the use of much simpler, higher-reliability AC induction motors known as asynchronous traction motors. Synchronous AC motors are also occasionally used, as in the French TGV.

==== Mounting of motors ====
Before the mid-20th century, a single large motor was often used to drive multiple driving wheels through connecting rods that were very similar to those used on steam locomotives. Examples are the Pennsylvania Railroad DD1, FF1 and L5 and the various Swiss Crocodiles. It is now standard practice to provide one traction motor driving each axle through a gear drive.

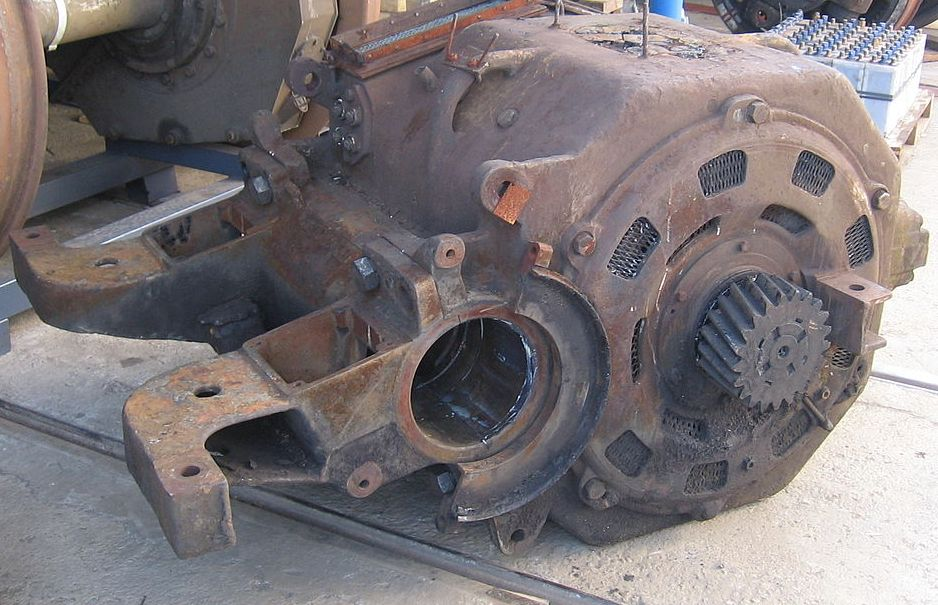
Nose-suspended DC traction motor for a Czech ČD class 182 locomotive

Usually, the traction motor is three-point suspended between the bogie frame and the driven axle; this is referred to as a "nose-suspended traction motor". The problem with such an arrangement is that a portion of the motor's weight is unsprung, increasing unwanted forces on the track. In the case of the Pennsylvania Railroad GG1, two frame-mounted motors drove each axle through a quill drive. The "Bi-Polar" electric locomotives built by General Electric for the Milwaukee Road had direct drive motors. The rotating shaft of the motor was also the axle for the wheels. In the case of French TGV power cars, a motor mounted to the power car's frame drives each axle; a "tripod" drive allows a small amount of flexibility in the drive train allowing the bogies to pivot. By mounting the relatively heavy traction motor directly to the power car's frame, rather than to the bogie, better dynamics are obtained, allowing better high-speed operation.

== Rating ==
Electric locomotives usually have a continuous and one-hour rating. The one-hour rating is the maximum power that the motors can continuously develop over one hour without overheating. Such a test starts with the motors at +25 °C (and the outside air used for ventilation also at +25 °C). In the USSR, per GOST 2582-72 with class N insulation, the maximum temperatures allowed for DC motors were 160 °C for the armature, 180 °C for the stator, and 105 °C for the collector. The one-hour rating is typically about 10% higher than the continuous rating and is limited by the temperature rise in the motor.

As traction motors use a reduction gear setup to transfer torque from the motor armature to the driven axle, the actual load placed on the motor varies with the gear ratio. Otherwise-"identical" traction motors can have significantly different load rating. A traction motor geared for freight use with a low gear ratio will safely produce higher torque at the wheels for a longer period at the same current level because the lower gears give the motor more mechanical advantage.

In diesel-electric and gas turbine-electric locomotives, the horsepower rating of the traction motors is usually around 81% that of the prime mover. This assumes that the electrical generator converts 90% of the engine's output into electrical energy and the traction motors convert 90% of this electrical energy back into mechanical energy. Calculation: 0.9 × 0.9 = 0.81

Individual traction motor ratings usually range up to 1,600 kW (2,100 hp).

Another important factor when traction motors are designed or specified is operational speed. The motor armature has a maximum safe rotating speed at or below which the windings will stay safely in place.

Above this maximum speed, centrifugal force on the armature throws the windings outward. In severe cases this leads to "bird-nesting", in which the windings contact the motor housing, break loose from the armature and uncoil.

Bird-nesting from overspeed can occur in the motors of a powered locomotive, or in those of a dead-in-consist locomotive being hauled within a train that is travelling too fast. It can also follow the replacement of worn or damaged motors with units geared incorrectly for the application. Overloading and overheating can produce it below rated speeds, once the armature assembly and the winding supports and retainers have been damaged by earlier abuse.

== Cooling ==
Because of the high power levels involved, traction motors are almost always cooled using forced air, water, or a special dielectric liquid.

Typical cooling systems on U.S. diesel-electric locomotives consist of an electrically powered fan blowing air into a passage integrated into the locomotive frame. Rubber cooling ducts connect the passage to the individual traction motors, and cooling air travels down and across the armatures before being exhausted to the atmosphere.

== See also ==
- Electric motor
- Electric vehicle
- Electric vehicle battery
- Induction motor & Three-phase AC railway electrification
- Brushed DC electric motor
- Diesel–electric powertrain

== Bibliography ==
- British Railways (1962). "Section 13: Traction Control". Diesel Traction Manual for Enginemen (1st ed.). British Transport Commission. pp. 172–189.
- Bolton, William F. (1963). The Railwayman's Diesel Manual (4th ed.). pp. 107–111, 184–190.
