= FS Class ALe 582 =

Italian electric train

ALe 582
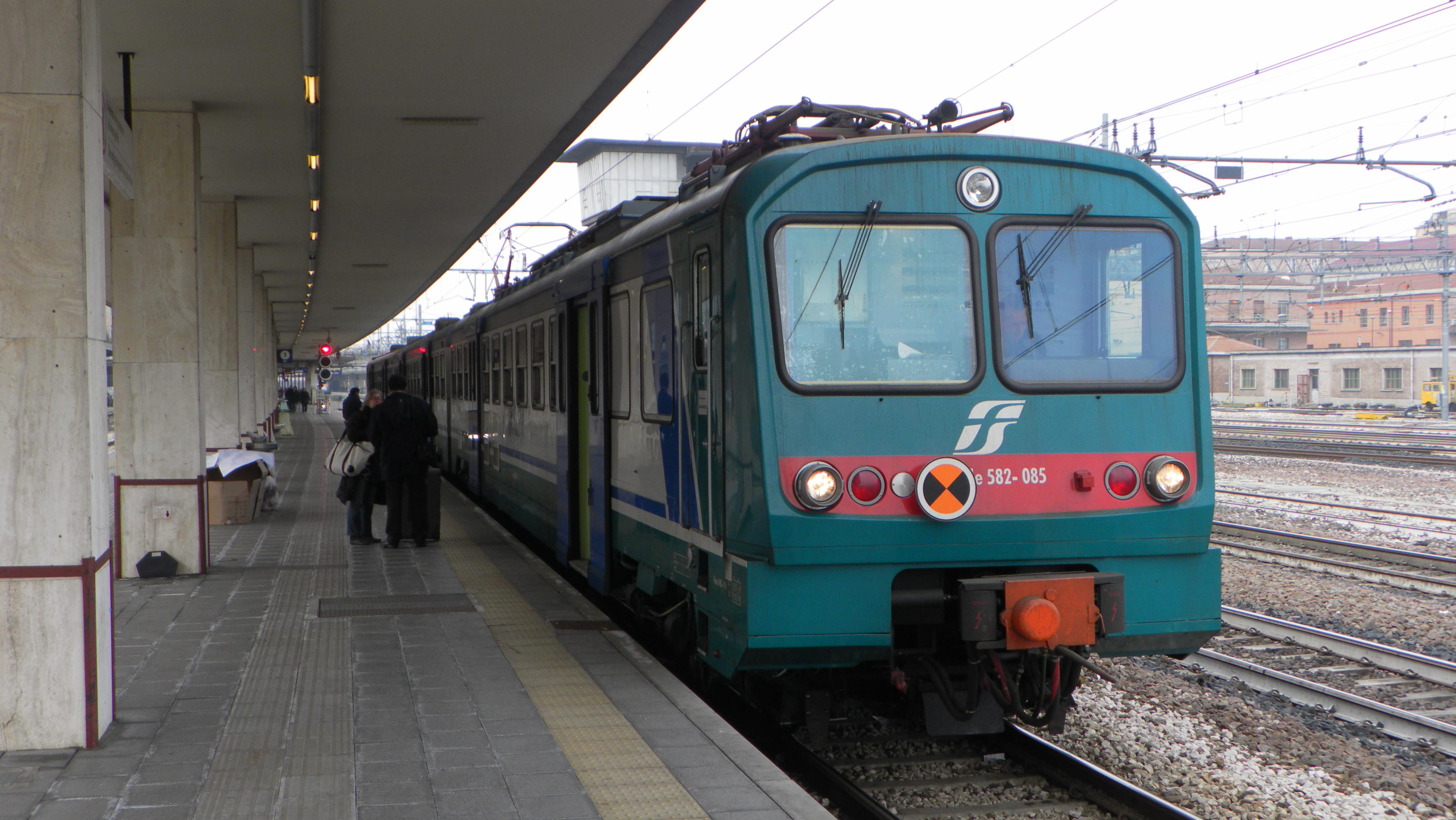
- ALe 582 in XMPR livery at Bologna Centrale railway station in 2013.
- Manufacturers: Mechanical part: Breda, Fiore, Stanga; Electrical part: Marelli, Ansaldo, Firema
- Constructed: 1987–1991
- Entered service: 1987-2019 FS 2009-2021 Trenord
- Number built: 90 sets
- Operators: Trenitalia, Trenord

Specifications
- Wheel diameter: 860 mm (34 in)
- Wheelbase: 2,560 mm (101 in) (bogies)
- Maximum speed: 140 km/h (87 mph)
- Transmission: 30/75
- Electric system: 3000 V DC catenary
- Current collection: Pantograph
- AAR wheel arrangement: Bo'Bo
- Track gauge: 1,435 mm (4 ft 8 1/2 in) standard gauge

The ALe 582 is an Italian electric multiple unit train designed for commuter and medium-distance services, developed in the mid-1980s to replace pre-war and immediately post-war EMUs and locomotive-hauled trains on various lines in Sicily and Southern Italy, although they later diffused on the whole FS network. They're part of the "ALe Elettroniche" (Chopper-controlled EMUs) or "G.A.I." (the name of the manufacturers' consortium) family, together with their predecessors ALe 724 and their successors, the ALe 642.

While "ALe 582" is usually used to refer to the whole trainset, it officially indicates only the motor-cab car: the trailers are classified Le 562 (cab car), Le 763 (1st class) or Le 884 (2nd class).

== History ==
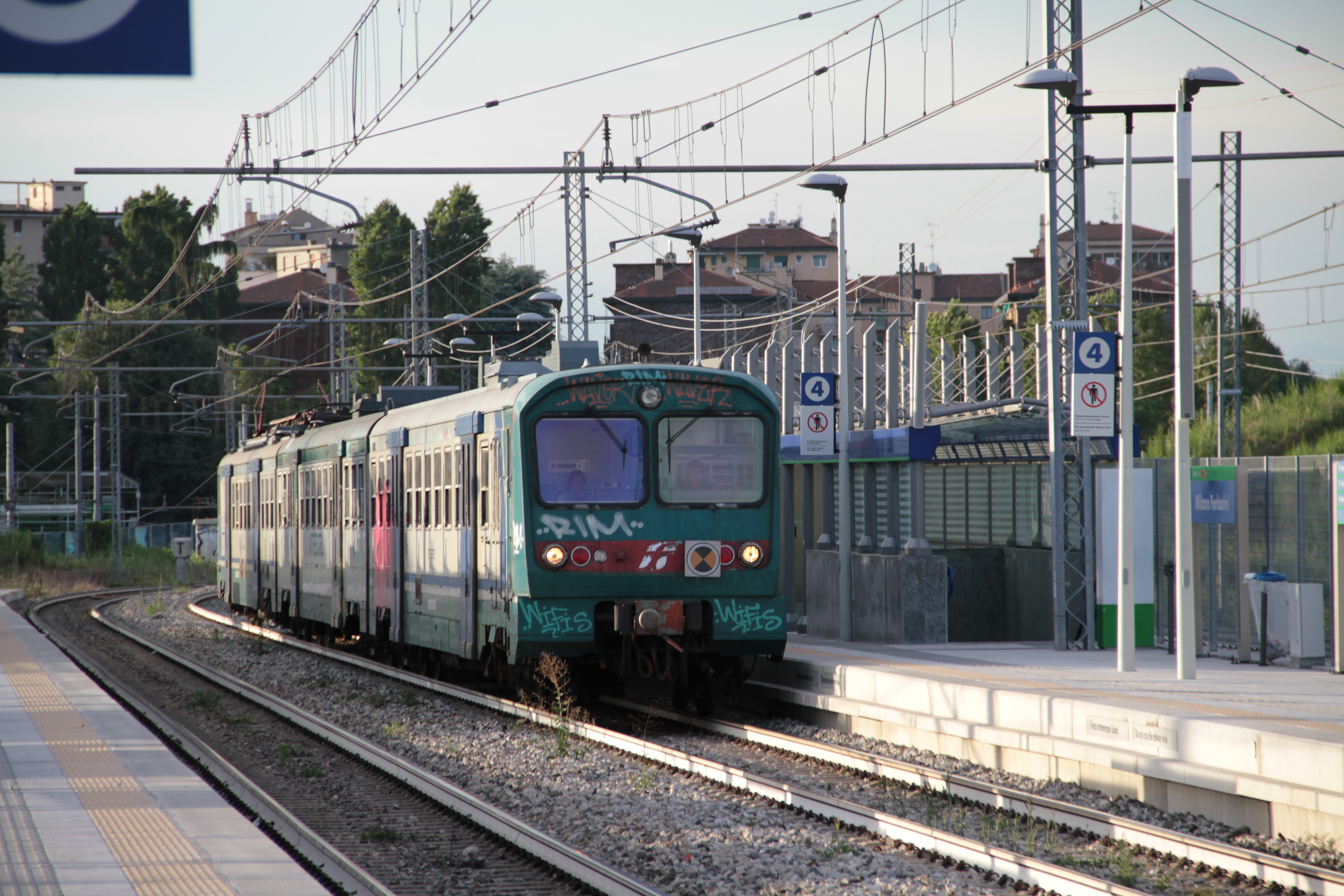
ALe 582 in the XMPR livery.

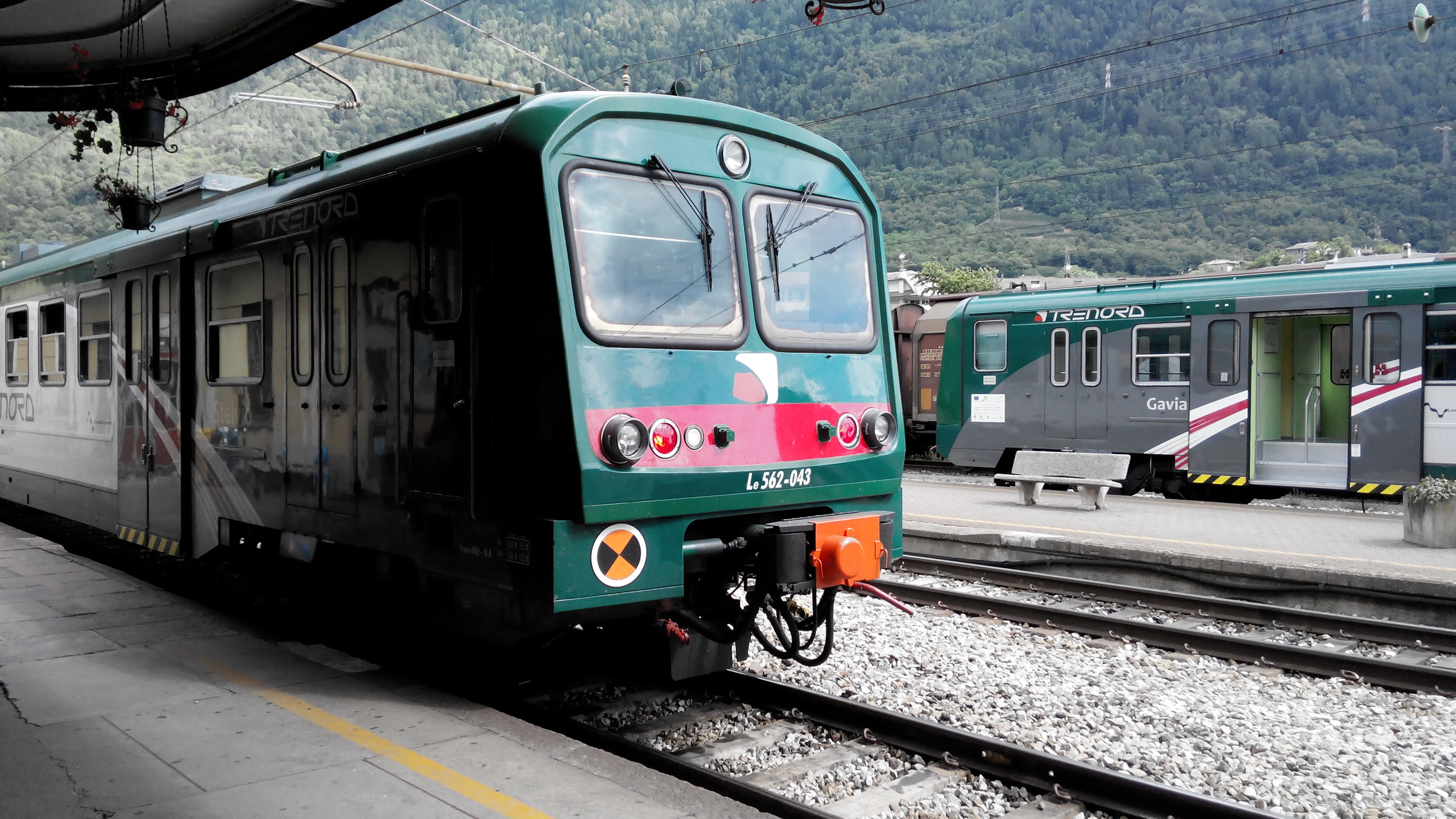
Ex-trenitalia ALe 582 (Le 562 in the picture) in Trenord's livery.

The ALe 582 project was developed in the mid-eighties in order to replace old rolling stock used for commuter traffic and medium-distance (regional and local services) on secondary lines of Sicily and southern Italy. It is a strict derivative of the ALe 724 Class, which was introduced in 1983 for commuter services around Naples, Milan and Turin.

The most noticeable (and one of the very few) difference from the ALe 724s is the redesigned FRP-made cab front, designed to cope with new crash-worthiness regulations.

The order of the first batch was placed in mid-1984 and deliveries began in 1987, with production assigned to the G.A.I. Consortium, formed by Breda Costruzioni Ferroviarie, Officine Fiore Lucania, Officine Meccaniche Stanga, Ansaldo Transporti, Firema Trasporti (bodyshell and mechanical part) and Ercole Marelli (electrical and electronics part).

They were delivered in the striking "MDVE" red, orange and dark grey livery, and between the late '90s and the early '2000s they were repainted in the new Trenitalia XMPR livery. Starting from 2009, ex-Trenitalia units handed over to Trenord received the latter's dark green and white livery.

The trains are usually formed of an Ale 582 (motor-cab car), one or two intermediate trailers (1st class Le 763 pr 2nd class Le 884) and a Le 562 (non-motor driving trailers), forming 3 or 4-car sets in Mc-R-R-Rc or Mc-R-Rc formation. Infrequent compositions also include 2-car sets in Mc-Rc formation or "double-motored" Mc-R-R-Mc formations.

In 2014, 6 ALe 582 were renewed by Trenord for use on the Valtellina Railway (between Lecco and Tirano via Sondrio). After the renovation, each received the name of a regional mountain peak.

== Technic ==
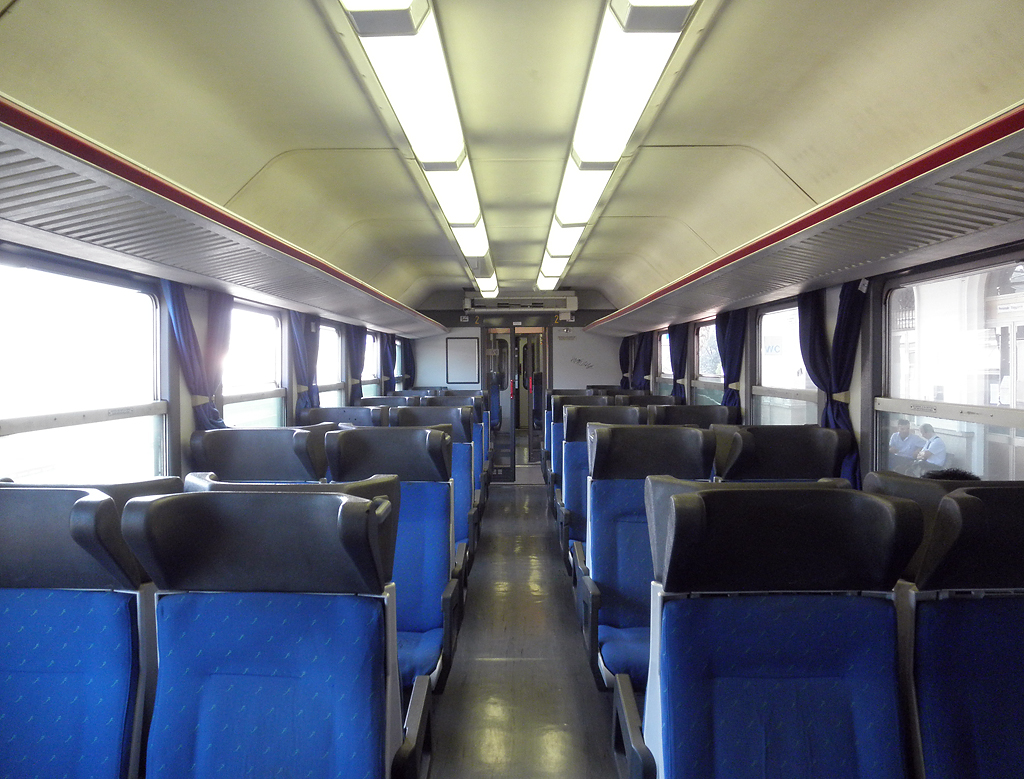
Interior of an unrefurbished ALe 582

One of the most striking changes compared to ALe 724 is the front part, which is made in FRP, to cope with then-new crashworthiness regulations, and also unlike the ALe 724s, which are 2nd class-only, ALe 582s may have first class (with three rows of seats) or second class (with four rows of seats) compartments. Trenord's ex-trenitalia units had their 1st class compartment declassed to 2nd, but they still keep the three rows of (and the same) seats. Intermediate trailers (Le763 and Le884s) are not equipped with toilets.

All the traction equipment is concentrated on the ALe 582 motor-cab cars, which are equipped with four nose-suspended motors, two per bogey, permanently combined in "semi-parallel" (the two motors on each bogey are connected in series, and the two bogeys are connected in parallel). Gears provide the transmission from the motor to the wheel, using a 30/75 gear ratio.

The electronics and traction control equipment is concentrated in a dedicated compartment, called "A.T." (Alta-Tensione, "High-Voltage" comparto) located between the driving cab and the first passenger door on ALe 582.

The compartment houses the GTO chopper traction control, manufactured by Ercole Marelli and similar to the one used on ETR450s, the I.R. (interruttore rapid o - the 3Kv main switch), the transformer, the fuses and other important equipment. Coupler adapters, short-circuiting bars and other emergency or maintenance equipment is also stored in the A.T. compartment.

The pantographs (two per ALe 582) are of the Type 52, one of the FS-designed unified-type pantographs.

Braking is electro-pneumatic, managed by an Oerlikon-made controller. Like all the other G.A.I. EMUs, ALe 582s are equipped with regenerative brakes; regenerated electricity can either be sent back to the catenary or dissipated on the resistors located on the roof of the ALe (between the pantographs). Air braking replaces electric one below the speed of 30 km/h.

The bogeys were designed by Fiat Ferroviaria, and they use air-suspensions.

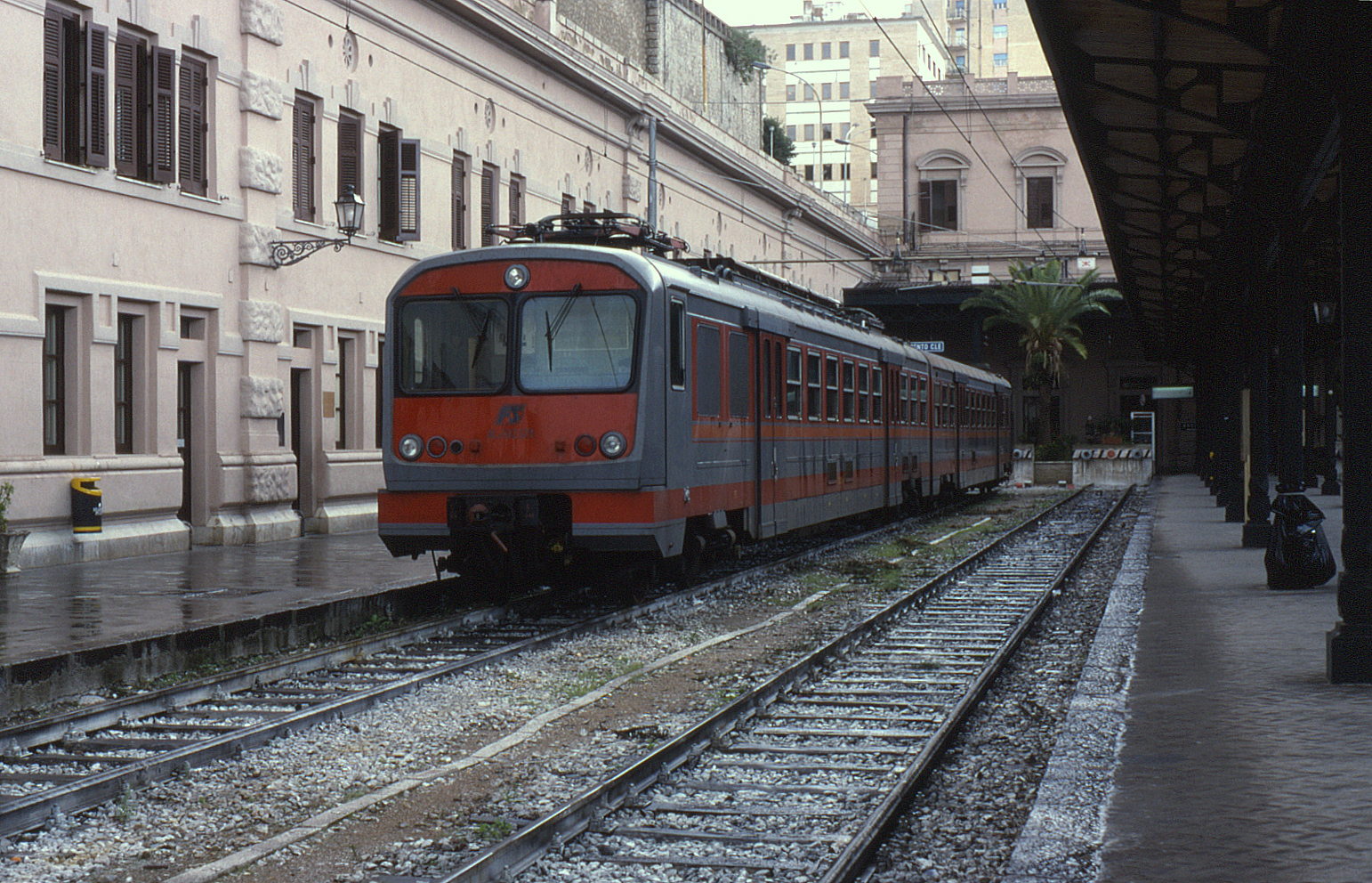
An ALe 582 in the original "MDVE" livery at Agrigento Centrale station.

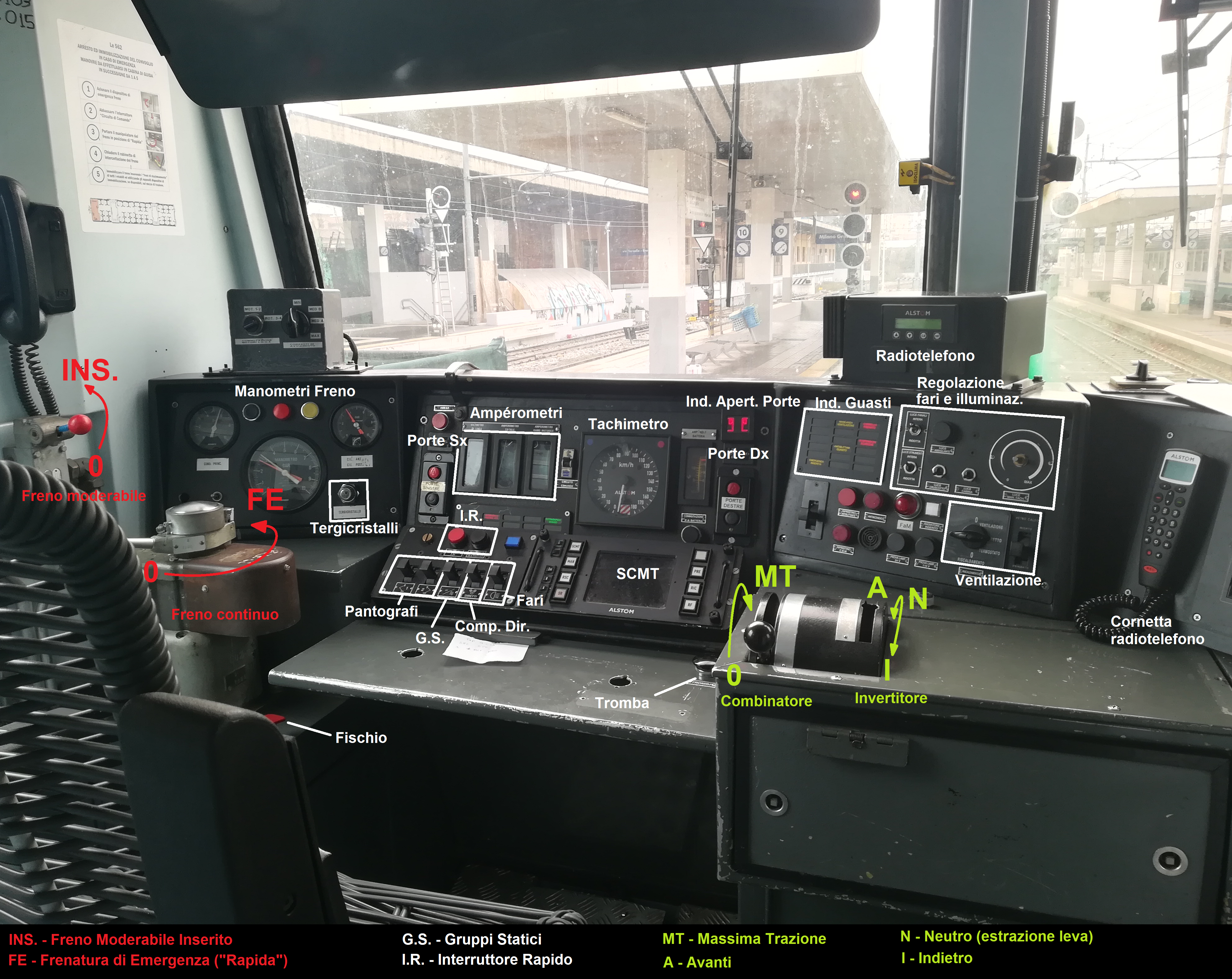
The cab of an ALe 582. ALe 724s and 642s have almost identical ones.

== Lines served ==
The ALe 582 runs railway lines the following regions:

1. Sicily
2. Lombardy
3. Campania
4. Tuscany (occasionally: other times ALe 642)
5. Emilia Romagna (occasionally: other times ALe 642)
6. Abruzzo

=== Commuter rail lines ===
ALe 582 operates on:

Milan suburban railway service
Naples metropolitan railway service (Line 2)
Bologna metropolitan railway service (occasionally: other times ALe 642)

== See also ==
- Class ALe 724 - predecessor, developed for use on commuter and subway-like services in major metropolitan areas
- Class ALe 642 - successor, modified and improved version for Tuscany and Emilia Romagna regions
- Class EA.750 - derivative bought by Ferrovie Nord Milano, used together with double-deck Casaralta or Socimi "Hinterland" coaches.
