= Class 803 =

Class 803 may refer to:

- British Rail Class 803
- FS Class ALe 803
- ICE 1#Service Car (Class 803)
