= Genoa urban railway service =

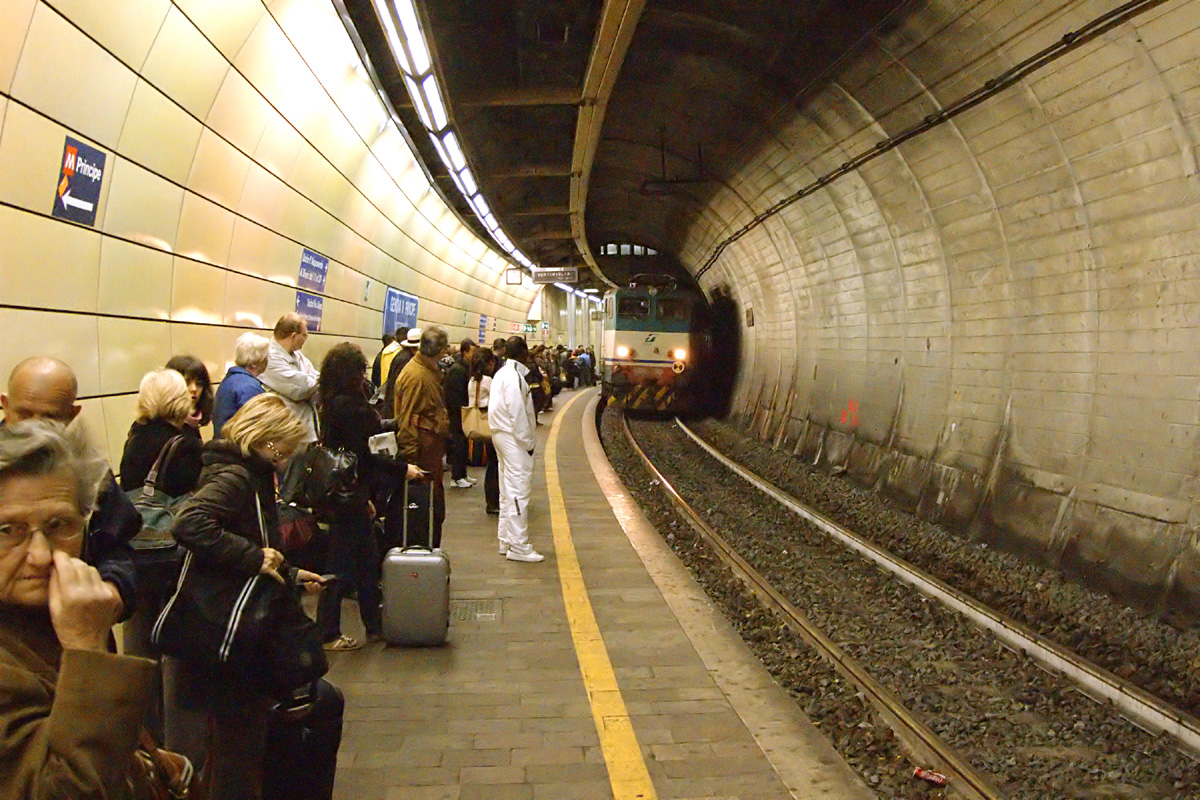
- Genova Piazza Principe Sotterranea

Overview
- Locale: Genoa
- Transit type: commuter rail
- Number of lines: 3
- Number of stations: 21

Operation
- Began operation: 1964
- Operator: Trenitalia
- Infrastructure manager: RFI

Technical
- System length: 50 kilometres (31 mi)
- Track gauge: 1,435 mm (4 ft 8 1/2 in) standard gauge
System map

The Genoa urban railway service is operated by Trenitalia on the lines around the city of Genoa.

== History ==
The urban railway service in Genoa was opened in 1964 by the Ferrovie dello Stato. It was the second urban railway service after the "metropolitana FS" in Naples.

The FS used the modern EMUs ALe 803, projected for commuter rail services. In 1976 they were substituted by their newer evolution, the ALe 801/940.

The service suffered because of the overcrowded section between Sampierdarena and Brignole, so from 1987 the line was doubled building another two tracks, by reusing some old harbor branches. The new bypass was opened on 23 May 1993 and included a new underground station at Piazza Principe.

During the years some new stops have been added: in 1994 Costa di Sestri Ponente, and in 2005 San Biagio and Via di Francia; in 2006 the old Pra station has been substituted by a new one.

== See also ==
- Genoa Metro
