= FNM Class E.750 (1982) =

Class of electric railcars

FNM E.750
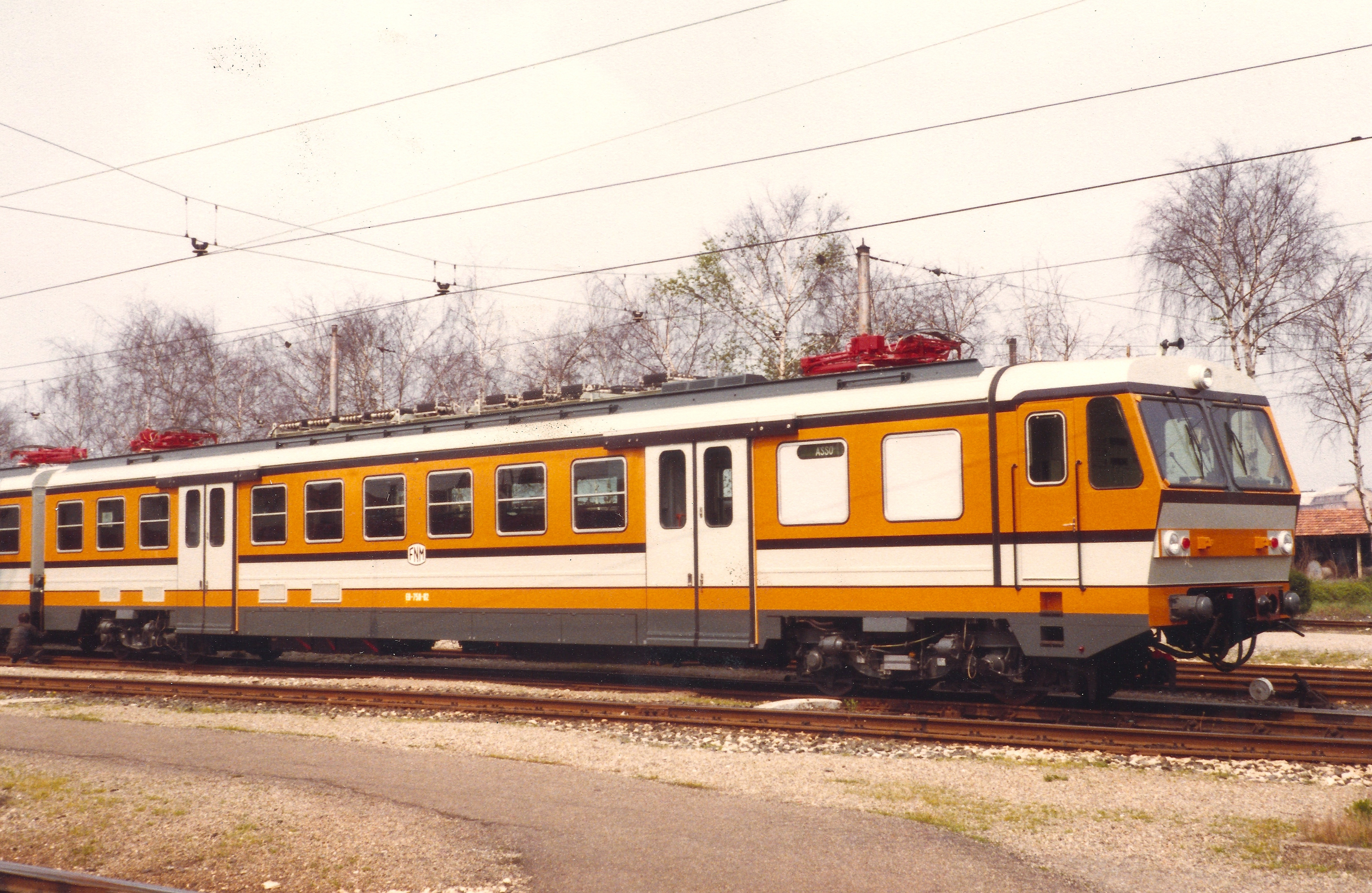
- First series
- Manufacturer: GAI (Ansaldo, Breda, Tecnomasio)
- Constructed: 1982–1984 (First series); 1992–1993 (second series)
- Entered service: 1982–2017
- Scrapped: 2017–
- Number built: 18 (First series); 6 (Second series)
- Number in service: 0
- Fleet numbers: E 750-01–18 (first series); E 750-19–24 (second series)
- Capacity: 72 seats

Specifications
- Car length: First series: 24,900 mm (81 ft 8 3/8 in); Second series: 26,115 mm (85 ft 8 1/8 in)
- Width: 2,780 mm (109 1/2 in)
- Height: 3,716 mm (146 1/4 in)
- Doors: Two
- Wheel diameter: 860 mm (33.9 in)
- Wheelbase: 18,640 mm (61 ft 1 7/8 in) (bogie centers)
- Maximum speed: 130 km/h (81 mph)
- Weight: 53 t (52 long tons; 58 short tons)
- Traction system: Electric
- Electric system(s): 3 kV DC, overhead line
- Current collector(s): Pantograph
- UIC classification: Bo'Bo'
- AAR wheel arrangement: B-B
- Track gauge: 1,435 mm (4 ft 8 1/2 in) standard gauge

The E.750 is a class of electric railcars of the Italian railway company Ferrovie Nord Milano.

== Production ==
The first series was built from 1982 to 1984, and was very similar to the ALe 724 of the Ferrovie dello Stato. The second series, built from 1992 to 1993, received a new cockpit design, similar to the ALe 582 and the ALe 642 of the Ferrovie dello Stato.

== Formation ==
The E.750 are used together with the Casaralta double-deck coaches and the Socimi coaches.
