= FS Class ALe 642 =

Italian electric train

FS ALe 642
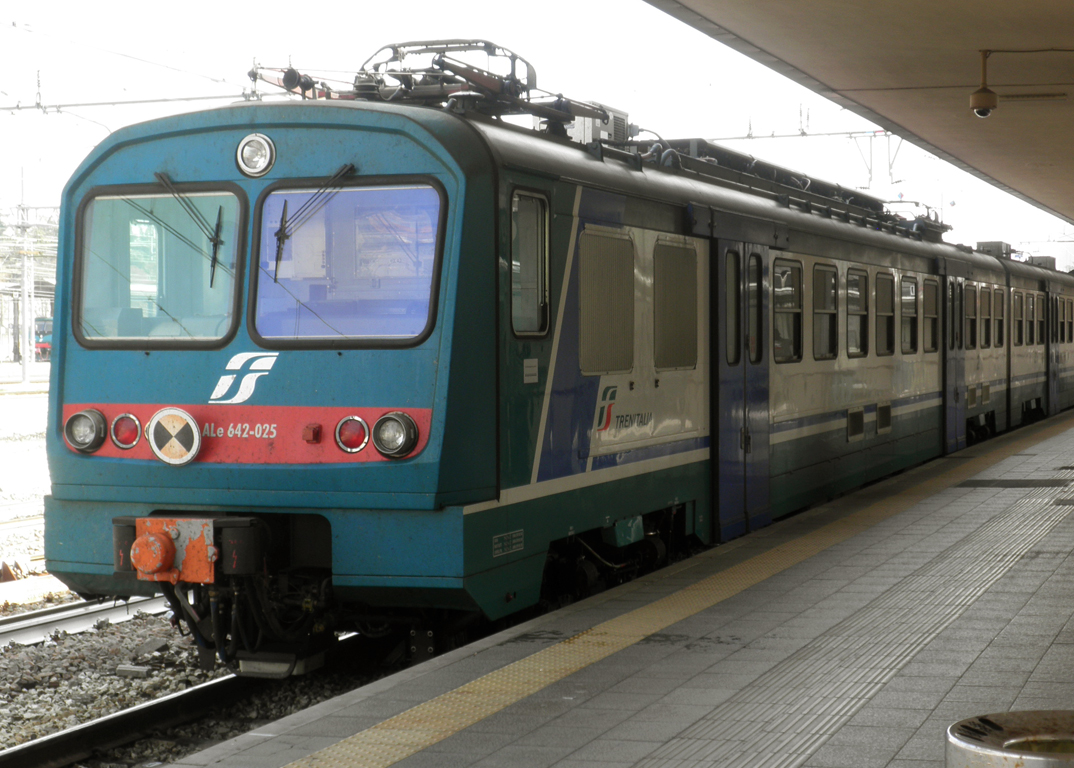
- FS Class ALe 642 at Bologna Centrale station
Type and origin
- Power type: Electric
- Builder: AnsaldoBreda, Firema, Stanga, Metalmeccanica Lucana
- Build date: 1991–1995
- Total produced: 60 engines, 60 coaches and 24 control cars
Specifications
- Configuration
  - AAR: Bo Bo + 22 + 22 + Bo Bo
- Gauge: 1,435 mm (4 ft 8 1/2 in) standard gauge
- Length: ALe 642, Le 682; 26,115 mm (85 ft 8 1/8 in), Le 764; 25,780 mm (84 ft 7 in)
- Loco weight: 67 t (66 long tons; 74 short tons) (ALe 642), 45 t (44 long tons; 50 short tons) (Le 764), 46 t (45 long tons; 51 short tons) (Le 682) fully loaded
- Electric system/s: 3000 V DC
- Current pickup: Pantograph
- Gear ratio: 30/75
- Loco brake: Oerlikon FV3E
Performance figures
- Maximum speed: 140 km/h (87 mph)
Career
- Operators: Trenitalia
- Delivered: 1991
- Last run: 2024
- Retired: 2024
- Disposition: Out of service

FS ALe 642 is a class of Italian Electric Multiple Unit trains built from 1991 to 1995 for use on secondary lines and for commuter traffic. In service from 1991 to 2024.

== Description ==
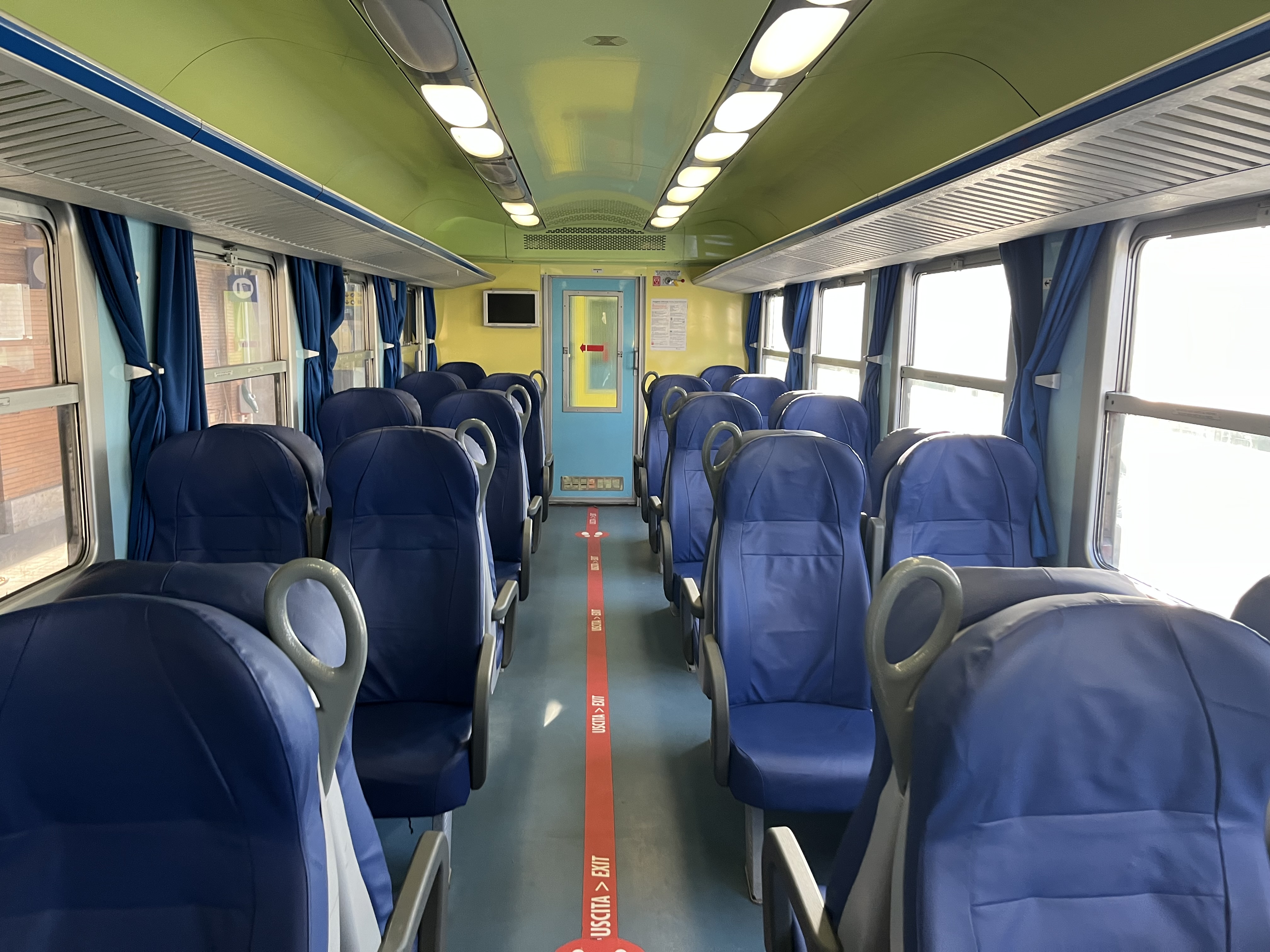
Interior of ALe 642

This class is strictly derived from the previous ALe 582 and ALe 724 EMUs, sharing most of the mechanical and technical characteristics. The main differences are in the electrical part (especially traction control and low tension circuitry) and for the presence of 2nd class only seatings. The frontal part containing cabins consists of a preformed structure made of polyester reinforced with fiberglass. They originally had the Navetta livery, painted in gray with orange and red lateral stripes; now they all have received the corporate green-white XMPR livery.

=== Technical description ===
==== Units arrangement ====
Like the previous EMUs on which they are based on, Class 642 can be divided in one or more sections containing a varying number of elements:

- ALe 642.001 ÷ 60, the engine units with driving cabins (64 seats, 67 t);
- Le 764.101 ÷ 140, non motorized carriage units (76 seats, 45 t);
- Le 682.001 ÷ 022, non-motorized carriage units with driving cabin (68 seats, 46 t).

Each section must contain at least one ALe and one Le, with a driving cabin on each end; a train can be formed by a maximum of two sections coupled with Scharfenberg type automatic coupler. Basic section arrangement are:

– ALe 642 + Le 764 + ALe 642

– ALe 642 + Le 764 + Le 764 + ALe 642

– ALe 642 + Le 682 *

– ALe 642 + Le 764 + Le 682 *

– ALe 642 + Le 764 + Le 764 + Le 682 *

(where "M" are ALe 642, "R" Le 764 and "Rp" Le 682).

==== Electrical description ====
Engine units employ four direct current traction motors placed inside the bogies, two for each one of them.

They are fed by choppers, one per bogie; unlike ALe 724, where the regulation is shunt-chopper type and a resistor is used when accelerating at low speeds, a full-chopper system is used as on ALe 582 with the only difference that, in this case, Class 642s are fitted with three-frequency choppers (582s employ single frequency ones).

Chopper regulation allows rheostatic braking (active above/until 35 km/h (22 mph), about 7 km/h (4.3 mph) if also using pneumatic braking) and the current generated by motors can be sent to the overhead supply line if there are other trains able to absorb it. An interlocking valve limits to 0.4 bars the pressure into the brake cylinders of the ALes when electrically braking.

Low tension circuitry employs 24 V batteries (110 V on ALe 724 and ALe 582) recharged by 380 V three-phase 70 kVA DC/AC static converters, located on engine units and Le 682 and which supply electric current to auxiliary services.

== Composition ==
ALe 642 complexes normally consist of two traction units (ALe 642) in multiple control and their trailers (Le 764), interspersed between the two units. One of the two traction units can be replaced by the pilot car (Le 682).

The possible compositions are as follows:

– ALe 642 + Le 764 + ALe 642

– ALe 642 + Le 764 + ALe 642

– ALe 642 + Le 682 *

– ALe 642 + Le 764 + Le 682 *

– ALe 642 + Le 764 + Le 764 + Le 682 *

(* the Le 682 pilot car can be either at the head or at the rear of the train, being equipped with a driver's cab and suitable for remote control of the traction units)

If it is necessary, it is possible to form trains composed of more than one composition; in this case the individual compositions go to form a single train composed of several "sections."

It is not possible to couple two traction units without intermediate trailers.

The ALe 642 group is not electrically compatible with the ALe 582 and ALe 724 group, so the coupling of different groups is never realized.

== Revamping ==
Since 2010 the ALe 642 group have received substantial upgrades to improve comfort and extend their service life; new modern seats were installed to replace the original ones, interior's color scheme was slightly changed, electronic screens showing trip info were also added, as well as an improved air conditioning system. In addition to this, all units were fitted with the SCMT (Sistema Controllo Marcia Treno) safety system, thus making the entire group compliant with the latest safety regulations.

== Allocation ==
The last group of ALe 642 class was in service for the Pisa depot and performed short-range regional services in Tuscany and neighboring regions, on routes: Pisa-Pontedera, Pisa-Lucca, Lucca-Pisa-Pontedera, Lucca-Pisa-Livorno, Pisa-La Spezia, La Spezia-Parma, La Spezia-Pontremoli, Livorno-Pisa-Pontedera, Pisa-Follonica, Pisa-Piombino, Pisa-Livorno, Livorno-Cecina, Pisa-Campiglia Marittima, Pisa-Grosseto, Campiglia Marittima-Grosseto, Campiglia Marittima-Piombino Marittima, Grosseto-Orbetello, Pisa-Firenze, Pistoia-Porretta Terme, Pistoia-Firenze, Lucca-Montecatini Terme, Viareggio-Lucca-Firenze. Last complex that was in service, formed by ALe 642.045 + Le 764.143 + ALe 642.059 interrupted service since 14 February 2024, decreeing definitely the stop of the service for all group.

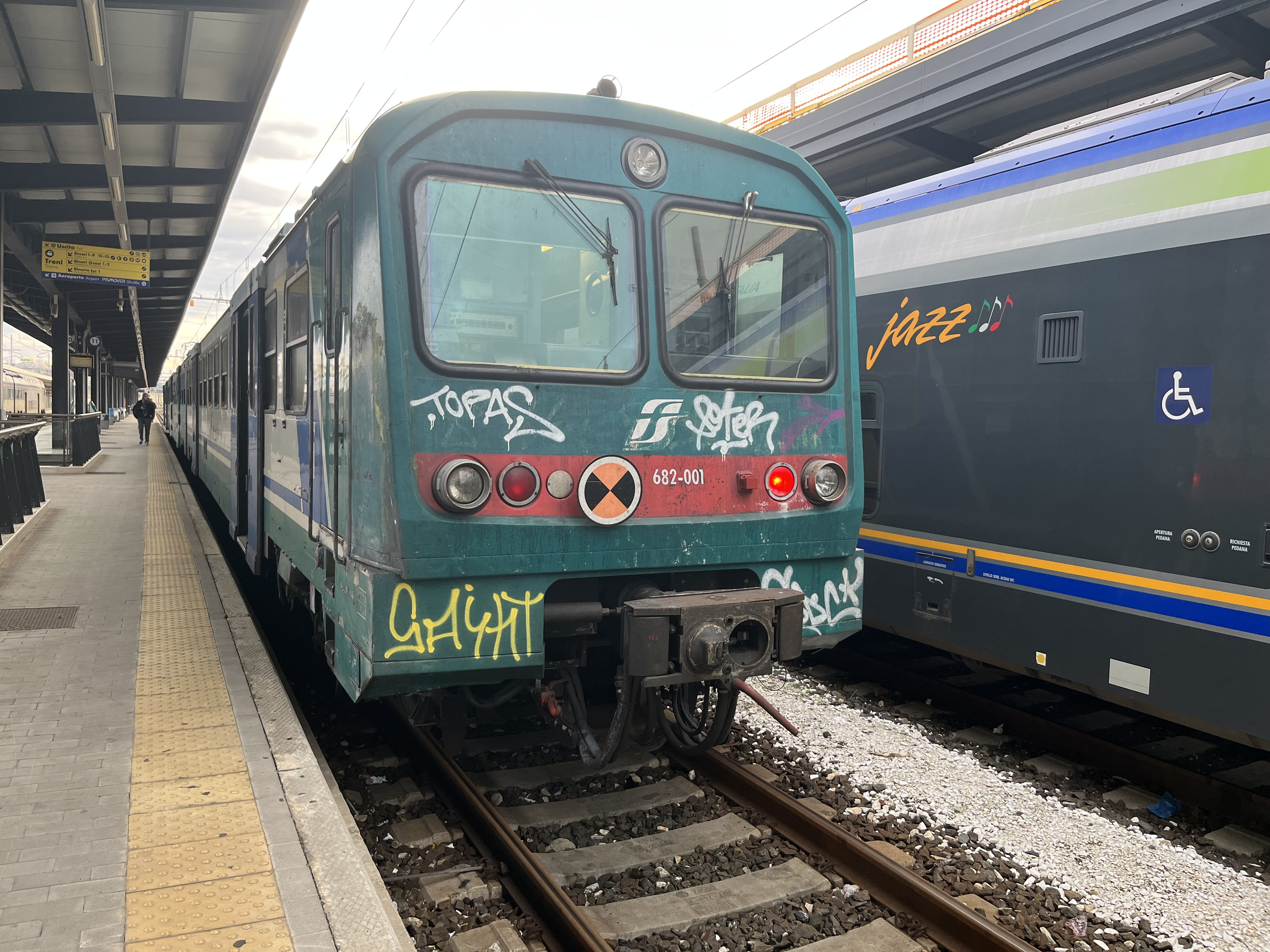
Pilot car Le 682.001 at Pisa Centrale station. Alongside, an ETR 425 Jazz

== Accidents ==
On 25 May 2022, while waiting for departure on La Spezia Centrale platform n°1, ALe 642 044 unit suffered severe damage to its electrical part and interior due to a fire, which has also determined the evacuation of the train station with consequential delays and disruptions.

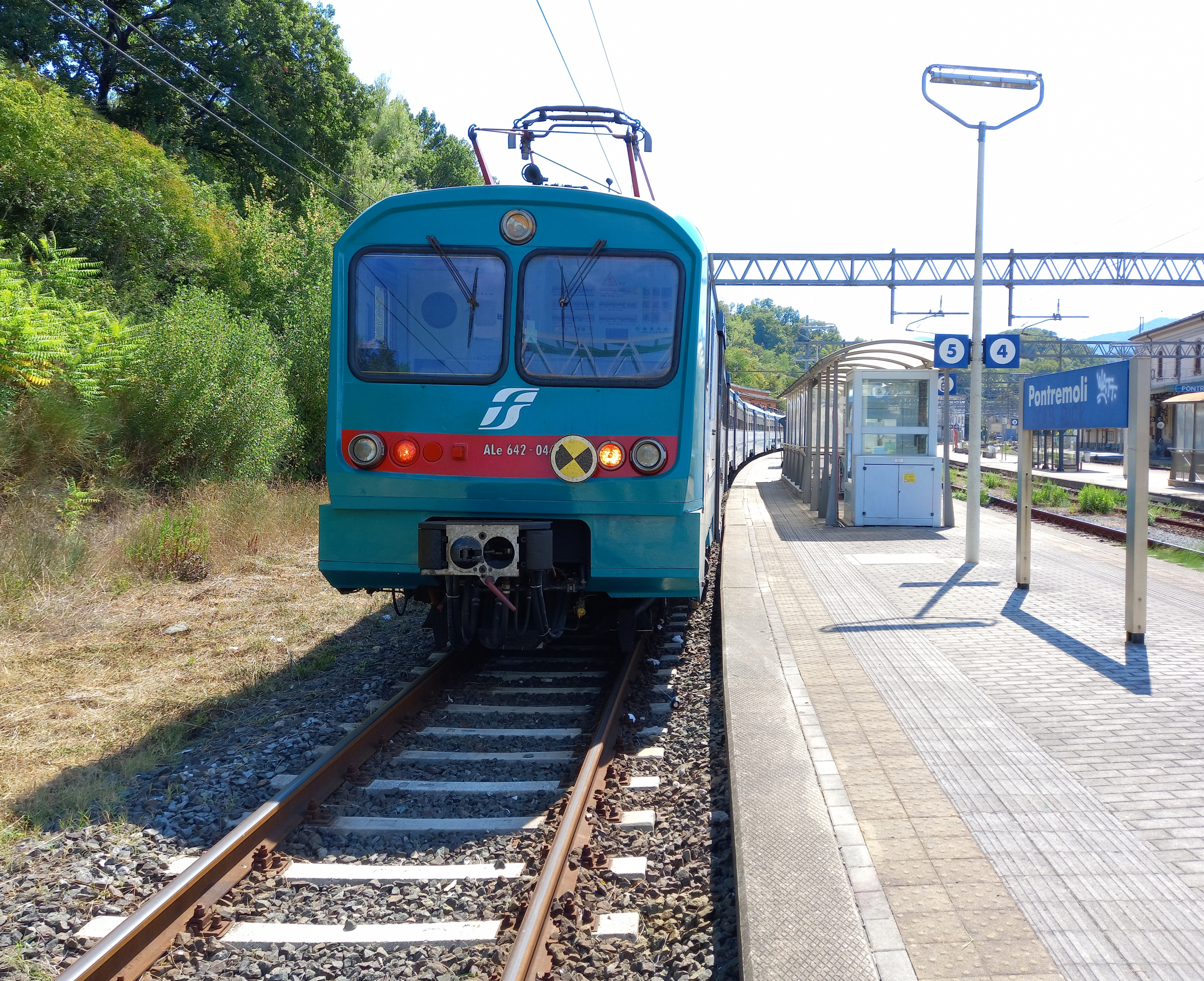
The unit involved, ALe 642 044, at Pontremoli station, September 2021
