= SEPSA Class EN 300 =

EN 300
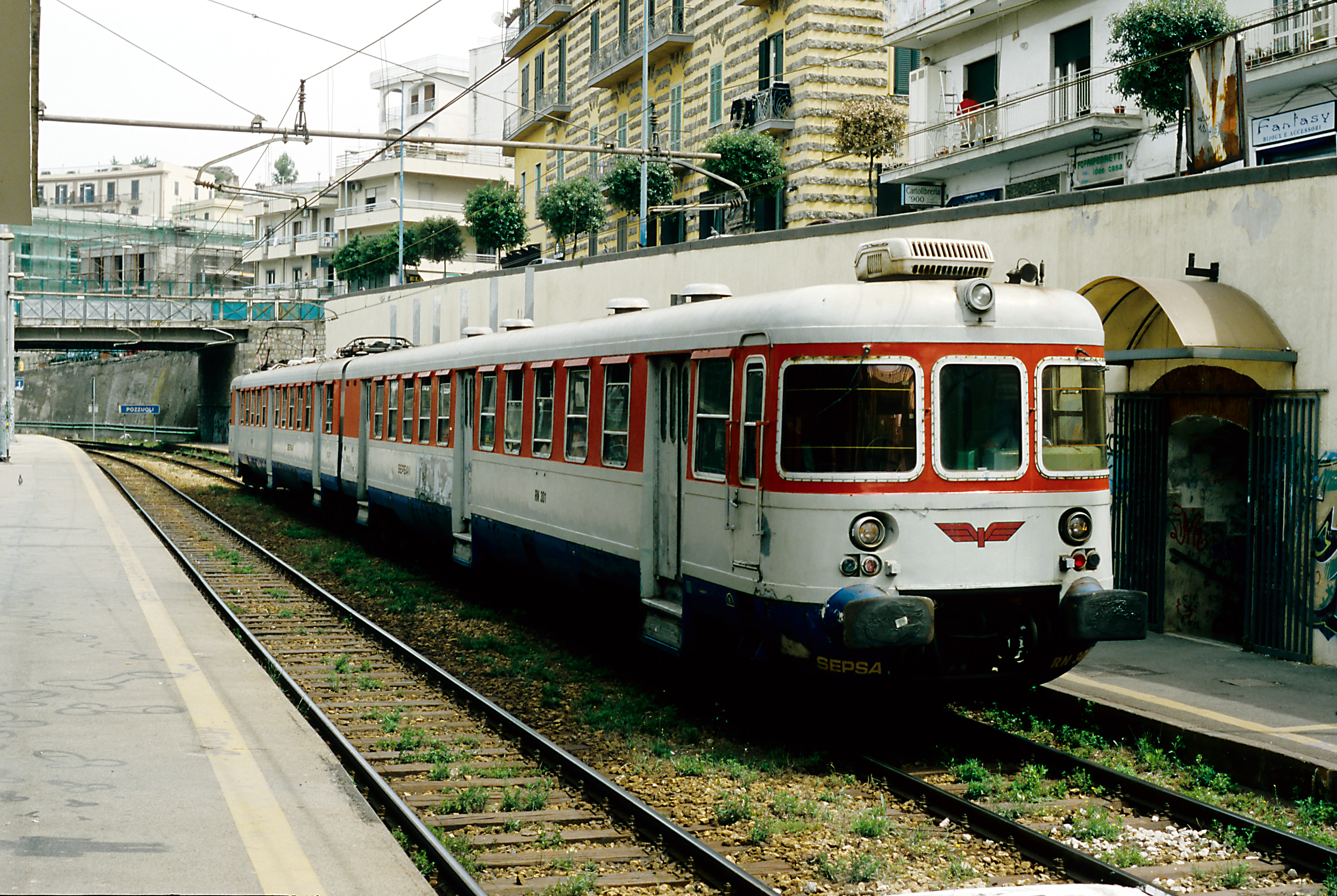
- Manufacturer: SOFER, Italtrafo
- Constructed: 1977
- Number built: 7 trainsets (railcar + control car)
- Fleet numbers: EN 301–307 (railcars); RN 301–307 (control cars)
- Capacity: every car 74 seats
- Operators: SEPSA
- Lines served: Circumflegrea, Cumana

Specifications
- Train length: 101.32 m (332 ft 5 in)
- Wheel diameter: 850 mm (33 in)
- Maximum speed: 90 km/h (56 mph)
- Traction system: electric
- Electric system(s): 3 kV DC, overhead line
- Current collector(s): Pantograph
- UIC classification: Bo′Bo′ + 2′2′
- Track gauge: 1,435 mm (4 ft 8 1/2 in) standard gauge

The EN 300 are a series of EMUs built in 1977 for the Italian railway company SEPSA, used on the commuter railways Circumflegrea and Cumana.

== Description ==
Each trainset is composed by 2 cars: a railcar (EN 300) and a control car (RN 300).

The numbers are EN 301–307 for the railcars and RN 301–307 for the control cars.

== History ==
The EN 300 were ordered in 1976 to renew the train sets of the SEPSA. They were delivered in 1977.

The EN 300 derivate from the ALe 803 of the Ferrovie dello Stato, but with less maximal speed and a shorter loading gauge.

They are used on the Circumflegrea and Cumana lines.

== Bibliography ==
- L. Munzi: Nuovi treni SEPSA. In: ″Italmodel Ferrovie″ Nr. 220 (November 1978), p. 762–765.
- Le napoletane... In: ″I Treni″ Nr. 320 (November 2009), p. 19.
