= FS Class ALe 803 =

ALe 803
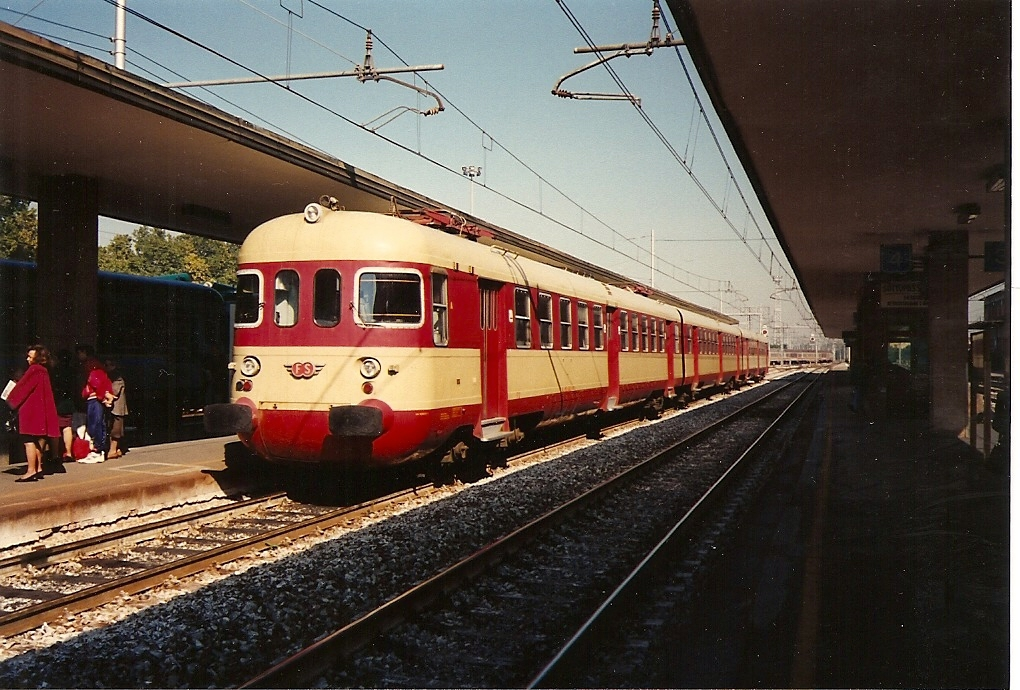
- ALe 803 in the original livery

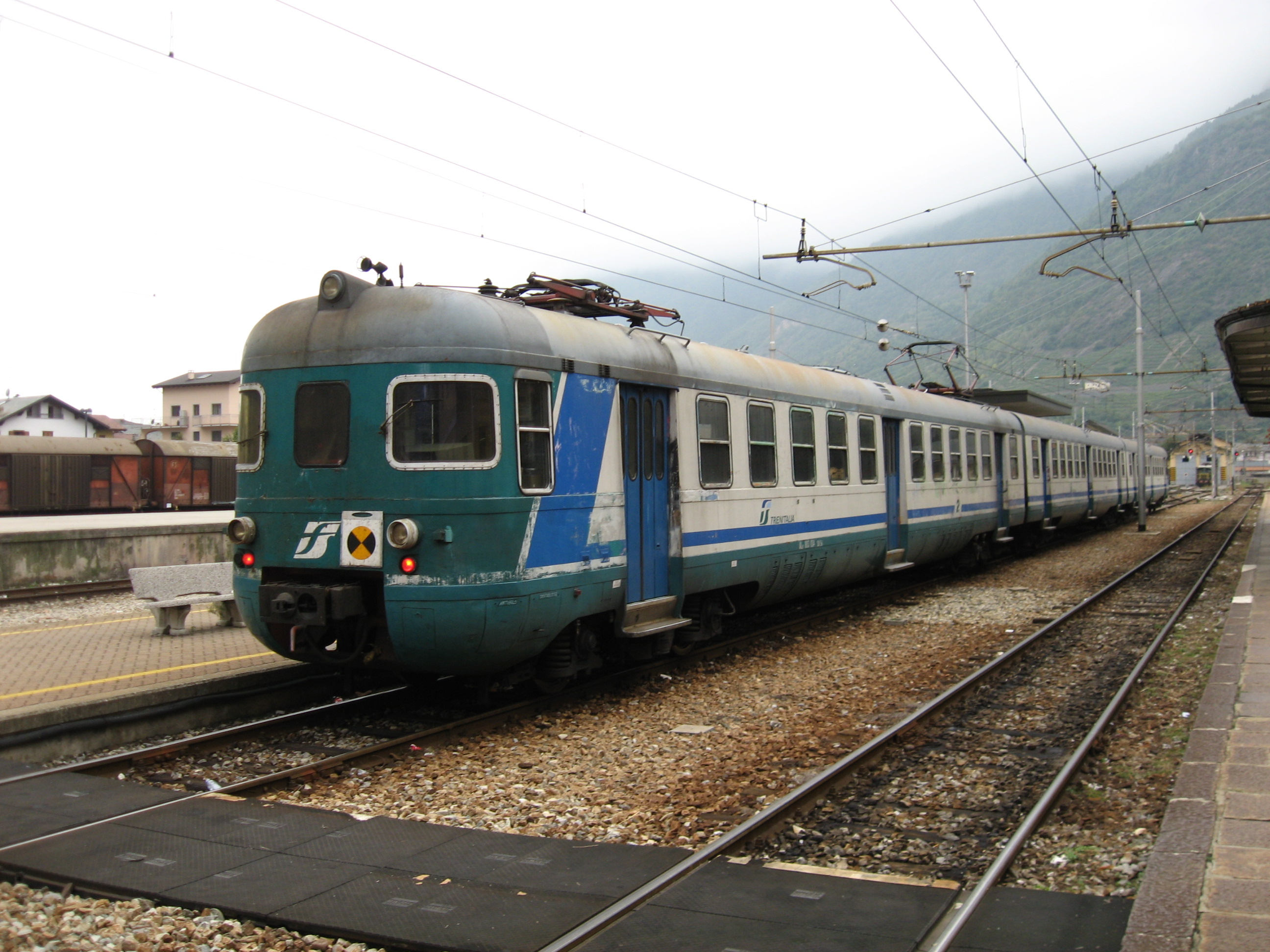
- ALe 803 in the XMPR-livery
- Manufacturer: Savigliano, Stanga, Aerfer, Ocren
- Constructed: 1961–1963, 1972–1973
- Number built: 53 trainsets
- Fleet numbers: ALe 803.001–053; Le 803.101–161; Le 803.001–053
- Capacity: every car 80 seats
- Operators: Trenitalia

Specifications
- Train length: 75,430 mm (247 ft 5 5/8 in) (1. serie); 75,060 mm (246 ft 3 1/8 in) (2. serie); 75,430 mm (247 ft 5 5/8 in) (3. serie, 3 cars); 100,200 mm (328 ft 8 7/8 in) (3. serie, 4 cars)
- Width: 2,900 mm (9 ft 6 in)
- Height: 3,815 mm (12 ft 6.2 in)
- Wheel diameter: 1,020 mm (40 in)
- Maximum speed: 130 km/h (81 mph)
- Traction system: electric
- Electric system(s): 3 kV DC, overhead line
- Current collector(s): Pantograph
- UIC classification: Bo′Bo′ (ALe 803); 2′2′ (Le 803)
- Track gauge: 1,435 mm (4 ft 8 1/2 in) standard gauge

The ALe 803 are a series of EMUs built in the 1960s for the Italian state railways FS, and now used by the railway company Trenitalia.

== Description ==
Each trainset is composed by 3 or 4 cars: a power car (ALe 803), 1 or 2 trailers (Le 803.100), and a control car (Le 803.000).

The numbers are ALe 803.001–053 for the power cars, Le 803.101–161 for the trailers, and Le 803.001–053 for the control cars.

== History ==
The ALe 803 were conceived at the end of the 1950s to resolve the increasing problems of commuting around the larger cities of Italy.

They were designed together with the ALe 601 series luxury railcars, with a similar structure and shared components.

In 1959 the Ferrovie dello Stato ordered a first series of 20 trainsets, and a second series of 15 trainsets specifically conceived for the Naples metropolitan railway, with fewer seats and more austere interiors. Each set was made of three distinct cars - power car, trailer and control car.

Those series were delivered from 1961 to 1963; the first were assigned to Rome, and in 1964 they were put in service in Genoa for its urban railway service.

The FS were satisfied with those early trains, so in 1971a third series of 18 trainsets was ordered, ten 3 car sets and eight 4 car sets (with two intermediate trailers). These were delivered in 1972–1973.

Beginning in the late 1970s the ALe 803 series trains were supplanted by the newer EMUs of ALe 801/940 and ALe 724. By 2009 only 15 of these trains were still in use. The last one was retired in 2015, train number 803-033.

== Derived units ==
The EN 300 series trains for SEPSA, built in 1977, were derived from the ALe 803.

== Sources ==
- Giovanni Cornolò: Automotrici elettriche dalle origini al 1983. Duegi Editrice, 2011 (reprint of 1985). P. 235–249.
- Attilio Di Iorio: ALe 803 per i pendolari. In: ″I Treni″ Nr. 319 & 320 (October & November 2009), p. 27–31 & 14–19.
