= FNM Socimi coaches =

Socimi coaches
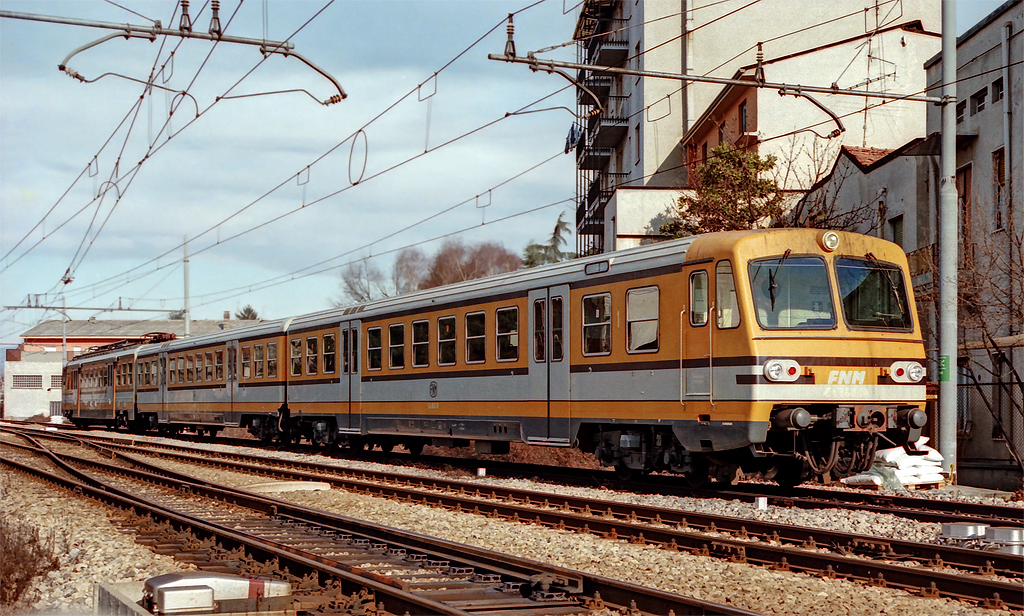
- Socimi coaches in the original livery

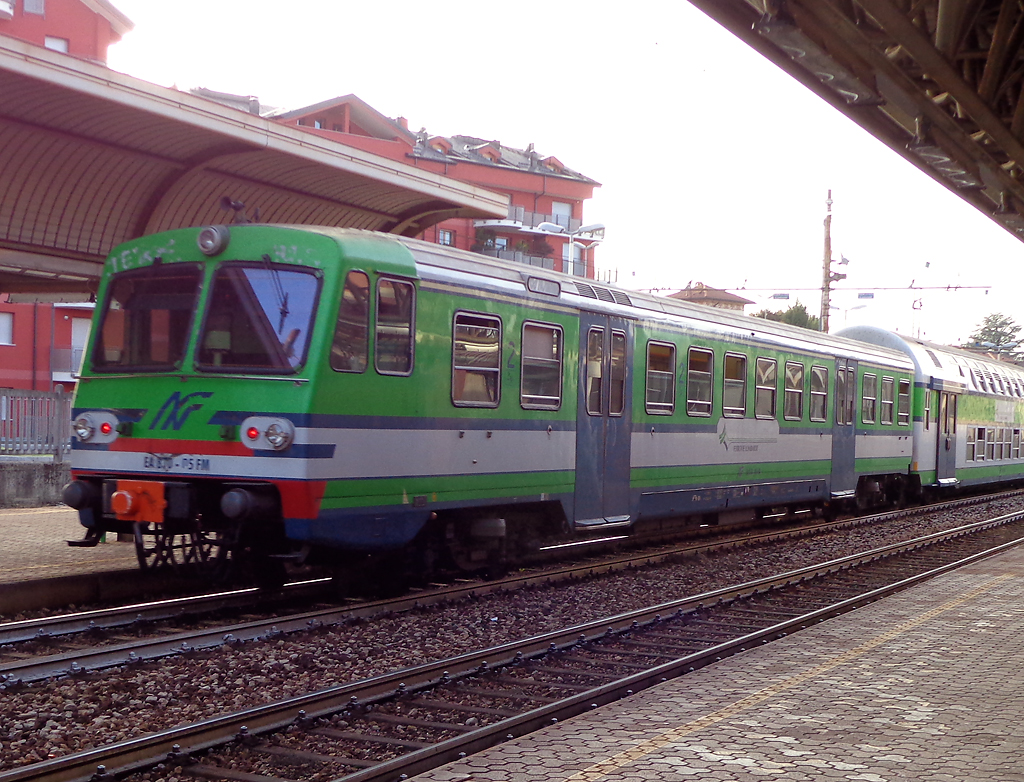
- Socimi coaches in green livery
- Manufacturer: Socimi
- Constructed: 1981–1983
- Entered service: 1981-2015
- Fleet numbers: E 860/870 (control cars); E 960/970 (coaches)
- Capacity: 88 seats (control cars); 92 seats (coaches)

Specifications
- Car length: 25,430 mm (1,001 in) (control cars); 24,300 mm (960 in) (coaches)
- Doors: Two
- Wheelbase: 17,500 mm (690 in) (bogie centers)
- Weight: 37 t (82,000 lb) (control cars); 34 t (75,000 lb) (coaches)
- Track gauge: 1,435 mm (4 ft 8 1/2 in) standard gauge

The Socimi coaches of the Ferrovie Nord Milano, also known as type hinterland, are a class of railway coaches for commuter trains, built in the 1980s by Socimi.

The coaches have been used together with E.620 locomotives or E.750 railcars. At this moment they are going to be scrapped, substituted by the double-deck railcars E.760 and E.710.
