= FS Class ALe 801/940 =

ALe 801 / ALe 940
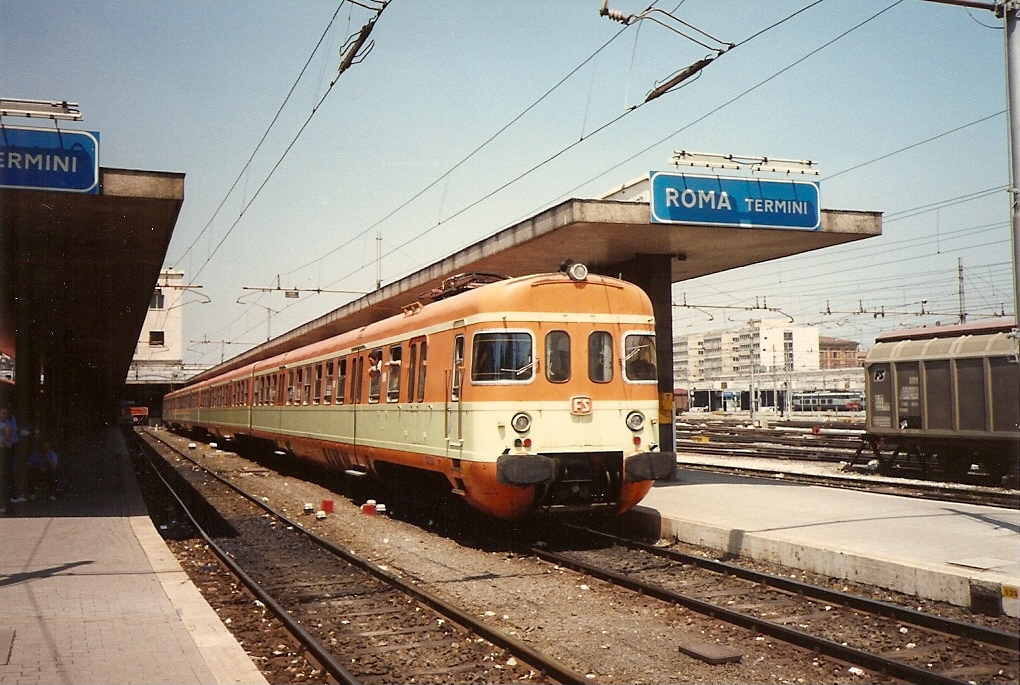
- Manufacturer: Breda, Stanga
- Constructed: 1975–1979
- Entered service: 1976–2016
- Number built: 65 ALe 801; 65 ALe 940; 130 Le 108
- Formation: 4 cars for trainset ALe 801 + Le 108 + Le 108 + ALe 940
- Fleet numbers: ALe 801.001–065; ALe 940.001–065; Le 108.001–130
- Capacity: 80 seats (ALe 801); 94 seats (ALe 940); 108 seats (Le 108)
- Operators: Trenitalia

Specifications
- Car length: 26,815 mm (87 ft 11 3/4 in) (ALe 801/940); 26,110 mm (85 ft 8 in) (Le 108)
- Height: 3,820 mm (12 ft 6 in)
- Wheel diameter: 1,040 mm (41 in) (ALe 801/940); 940 mm (37 in) (Le 108)
- Maximum speed: 150 km/h (93 mph)
- Weight: 70 t (68.9 long tons; 77.2 short tons) (ALe 801/940); 41 t (40.4 long tons; 45.2 short tons) (Le 108)
- Traction system: electric
- Electric system(s): 3 kV DC, overhead line
- Current collector(s): Pantograph
- UIC classification: Bo′Bo′ (ALe 801/940); 2′2′ (Le 108)
- Track gauge: 1,435 mm (4 ft 8 1/2 in) standard gauge

The ALe 801/940 are a series of EMUs built in the 1970s for the Italian state railway FS, now used by its successor, Trenitalia.

== Description ==
The ALe 801/940 are usually run in 4 car trains, with a power car at each end (ALe 801 and ALe 940) and two trailers (Le 108) in the middle.

== History ==
In the early 1970s, Ferrovie dello Stato decided to improve the rolling stock for its commuter rail services.

As chopper technology was at that time only at a prototype-state (with the so-called ″Treni GAI″), FS decided to order EMUs with traditional electric equipment. The ALe 801/940 were ordered in 1973, as an evolution of the older ALe 803, with better capacity and acceleration.

These trains were delivered between 1975 and 1979 and put into service around the larger cities of Italy.

Originally painted in a showy orange and yellow livery, that gave them the nickname of "Arancia Meccanica" (Italian title of the movie A Clockwork Orange, in the late 1990s they received the new XMPR-livery, based on green and blue tones.

== Sources ==
- Giovanni Cornolò, Automotrici elettriche dalle origini al 1983. Duegi Editrice, 2011 (reprint of 1985). P. 249–260.
