= FS Class ALe 724 =

Class of Italian electric multiple units

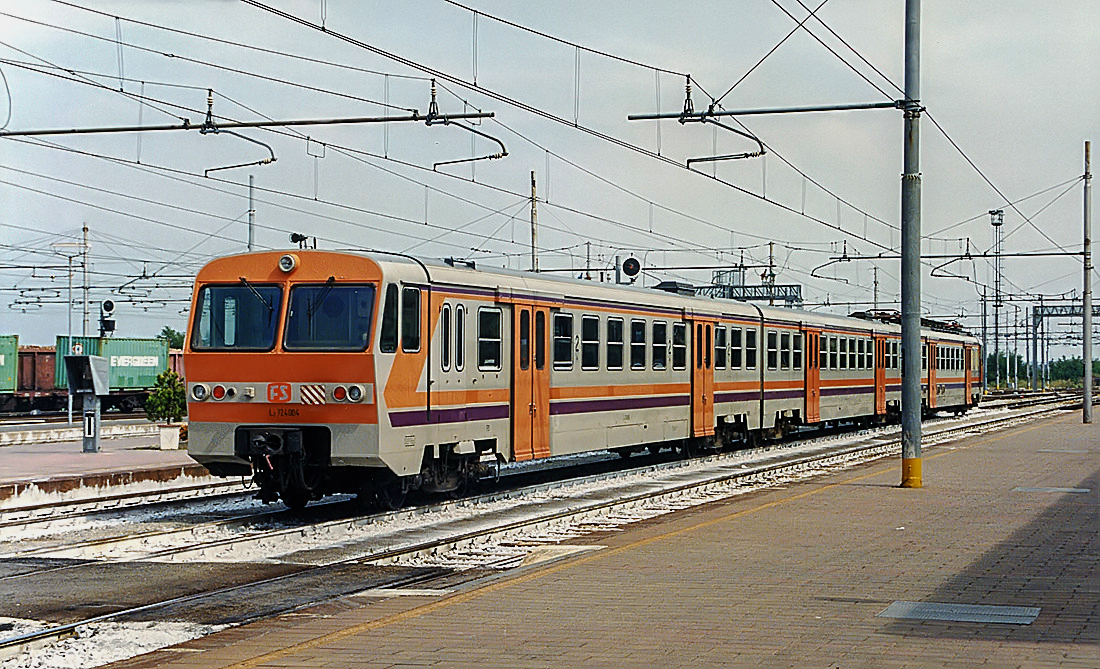
- ALe 724 in original livery

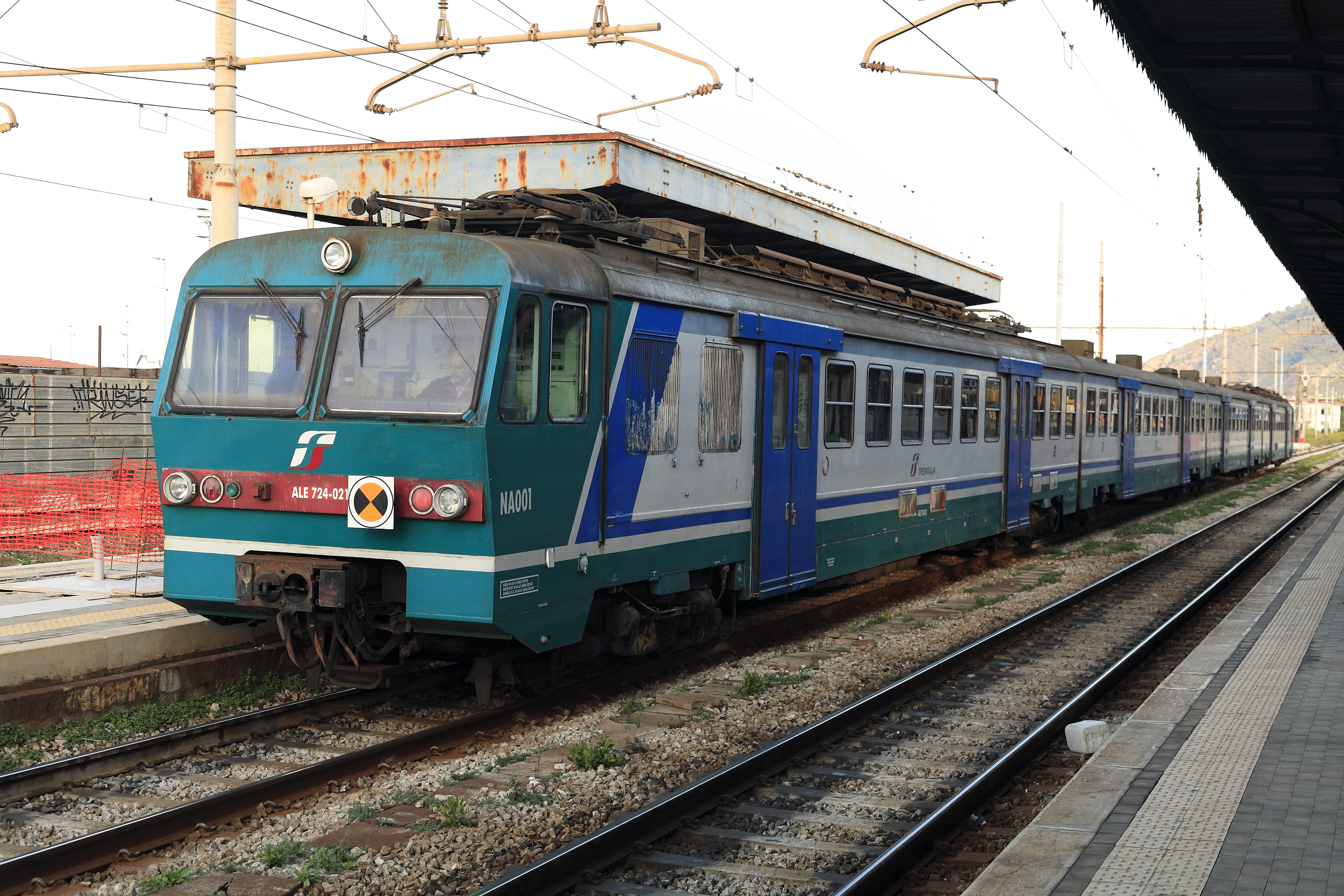
- ALe 724 in XMPR livery
- In service: 1982-2023 (except reserve material)
- Manufacturer: ALe 724: Breda, Fiore (mechanics); AMT, IMP (electrical equipment); Le 884: Breda; Le 724: Stanga
- Constructed: 1982–1984
- Number built: ALe 724: 90 units Le 884: 120 units Le 724: 30 units
- Formation: ALe 724 + Le 884 + Le 884 + Le 724 (30 EMUs); ALe 724 + Le 884 + Le 884 + ALe 724 (30 EMUs)
- Fleet numbers: ALe 724.001–090; Le 884.107–226; Le 724.001–030
- Capacity: ALe 724: 72 seats Le 884: 88 seats Le 724: 72 seats
- Operators: Trenitalia

Specifications
- Car body construction: aluminium alloy
- Car length: ALe 724: 24,900 mm (81 ft 8 in)
- Width: ALe 724: 2,950 mm (9 ft 8 in)
- Height: ALe 724: 3,176 mm (10 ft 5.0 in)
- Floor height: 1,055 mm (41.5 in)
- Platform height: 250 or 550 mm (9.8 in or 1 ft 9.7 in)
- Doors: 2 for each car
- Maximum speed: 140 km/h (87 mph)
- Weight: ALe 724: 55 t (54.1 long tons; 60.6 short tons); Le 884: 30 t (29.5 long tons; 33.1 short tons); Le 724: 31 t (30.5 long tons; 34.2 short tons)
- Traction system: electric
- Acceleration: 1.0 m/s^{2} (3.3 ft/s^{2})
- Electric system(s): 3 kV DC, overhead line
- Current collection: Pantograph
- UIC classification: ALe 724: Bo′Bo′ Le 884: 2′2′ Le 724: 2′2′
- Bogies: Fiat
- Coupling system: Scharfenberg
- Track gauge: 1,435 mm (4 ft 8 1/2 in) standard gauge

The ALe 724 are a class of EMUs of the Italian Ferrovie dello Stato, projected for suburban and regional services.

== History ==
In 1978 the Ferrovie dello Stato received a series of prototype-EMUs, the so-called "Treni GAI", that had for the first time a chopper technology instead of the classical electric equipment.

As the tests of the "treni GAI" were positive, in May 1979 the FS ordered a series of EMUs derived from them. The lombard regional railway company FNM had already ordered in 1978 some similar railcars, numbered E.750.

The FS ordered 60 trains, each made of 4 elements: 30 trains had two railcars and two trailers (ALe 724 + Le 884 + Le 883 + ALe 724) and due to their high acceleration were destined to the suburban services; the other 30 trains had only one railcar, with a driving trailer on the other side (ALe 724 + Le 884 + Le 884 + Le 724) and were destined to the regional services. Each train can carry 320 seated people.

The trains were delivered from 1982 to 1984; 20 trains in the suburban composition went to the Naples metropolitan service substituting the older ALe 803. The other EMUs went to Milan and Turin.

In January 2023, the last ALe 724 trains, in use on the Naples metropolitan service, were finally withdrawn from service. Initially, Trenitalia's plan, before the withdrawal, was to use them as reserve stock, but in February of the same year, they were transported to the Maddaloni-Marcianise Smistamento yard awaiting demolition.

== Bibliography ==
- Erminio Mascherpa: Arrivano le elettromotrici ALe 724. In: "I Treni Oggi" Nr. 23 (October 1982). P. 26–30.
- Giovanni Cornolò: Automotrici elettriche dalle origini al 1983. Duegi Editrice, 2011 (reprint of 1985). P. 249–260.
