= List of Hungarian locomotives =

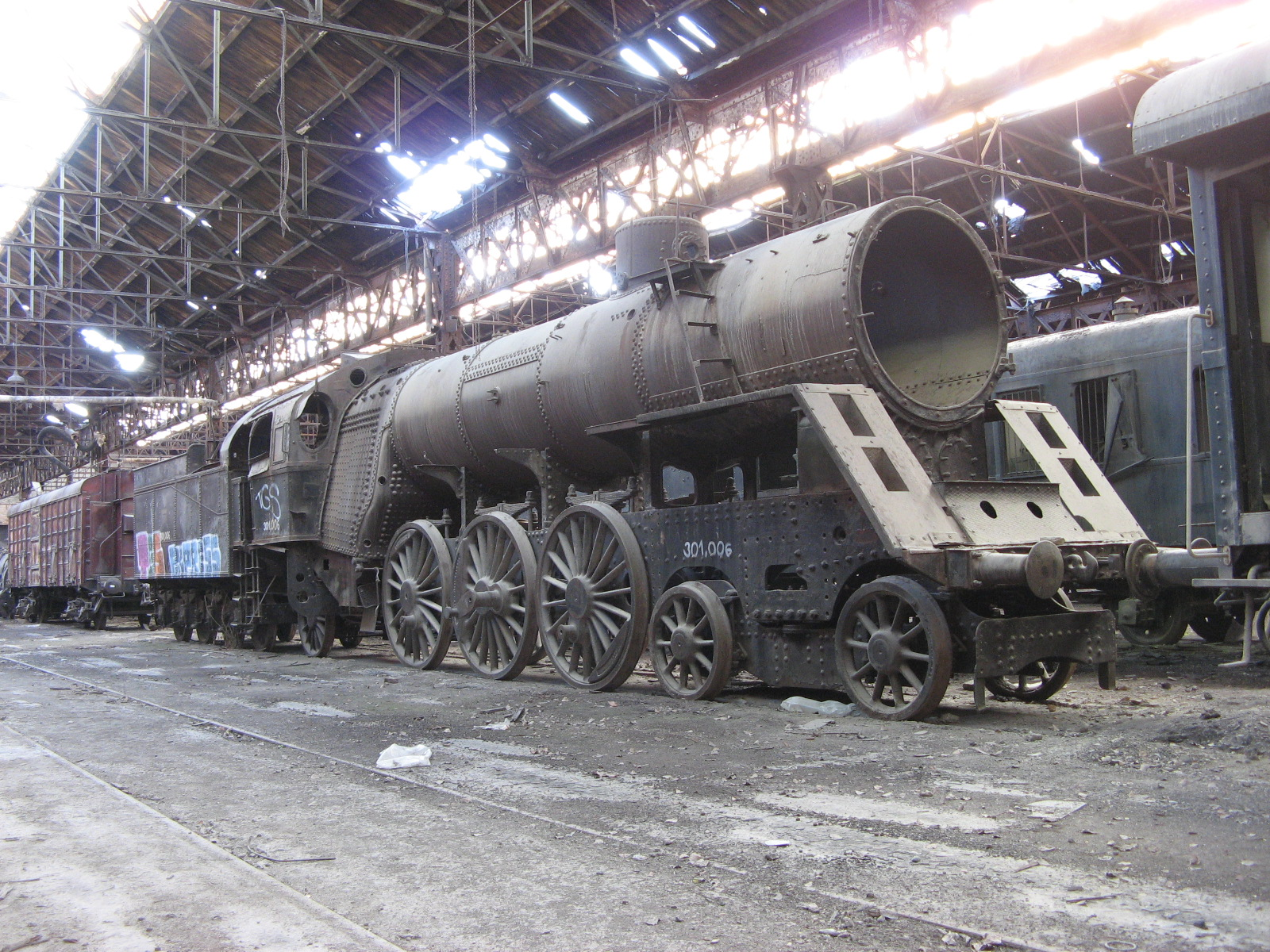
Hungarian old steam locomotive type 301, built in c. 1911–1914 (Railway Main Workshop in Istvántelek, Budapest, 2008)

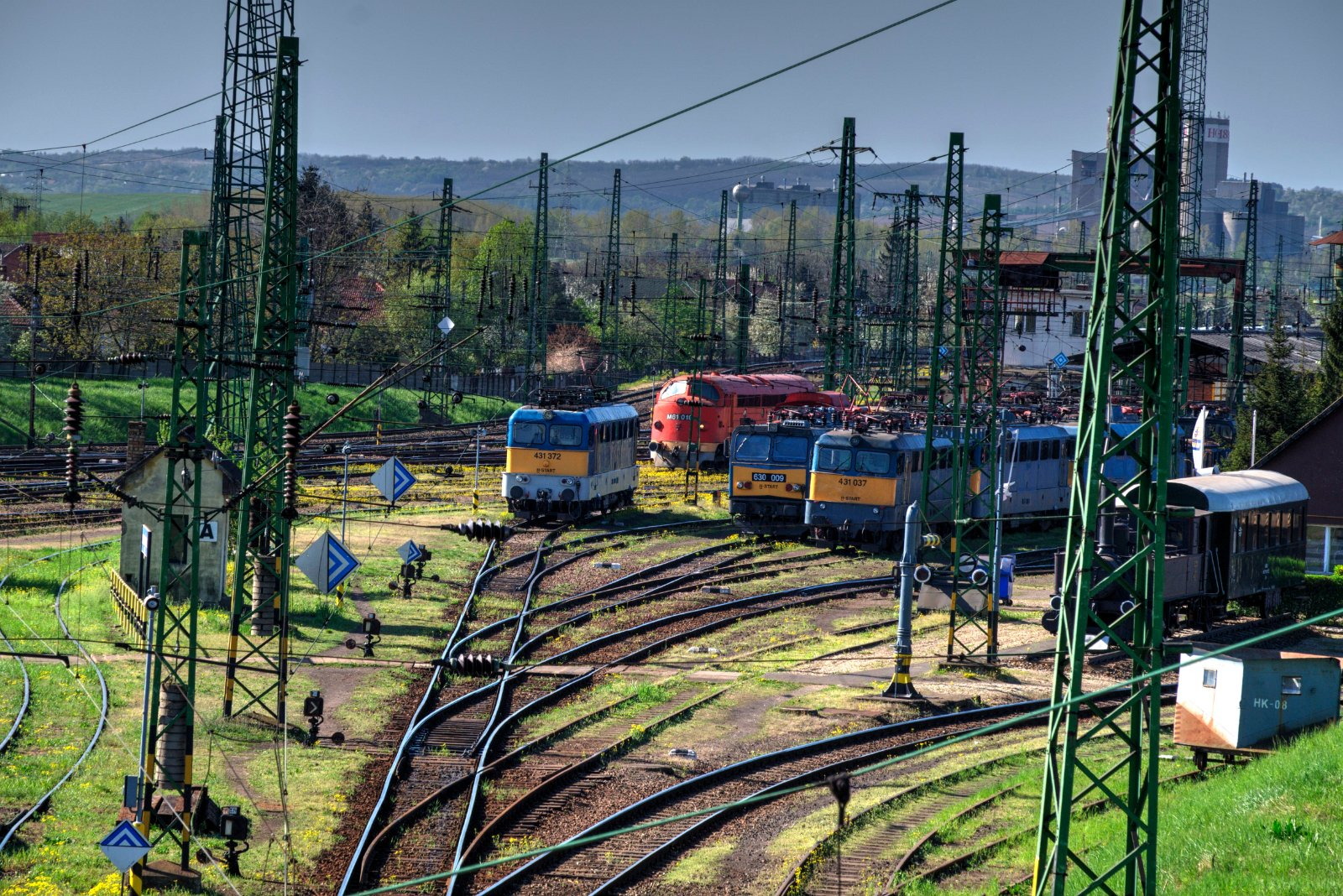
Various locomotives at the Vehicle Repair Plant of Miskolc-Tisza Railway Station (2018)

List of Hungarian (or used in Hungary) locomotives — The first railway line between Szolnok–Pest–Vác was built in Hungary in 1846, using steam locomotives. By the late 20th century, the steam engines had largely been replaced by diesel and electric locomotives that currently operate throughout the country's rail network.

Many classes of locomotives have come and gone throughout the railways' existence, they are listed based on their 1911 renumbering. All engines are standard gauge unless noted.

== Steam locomotives ==
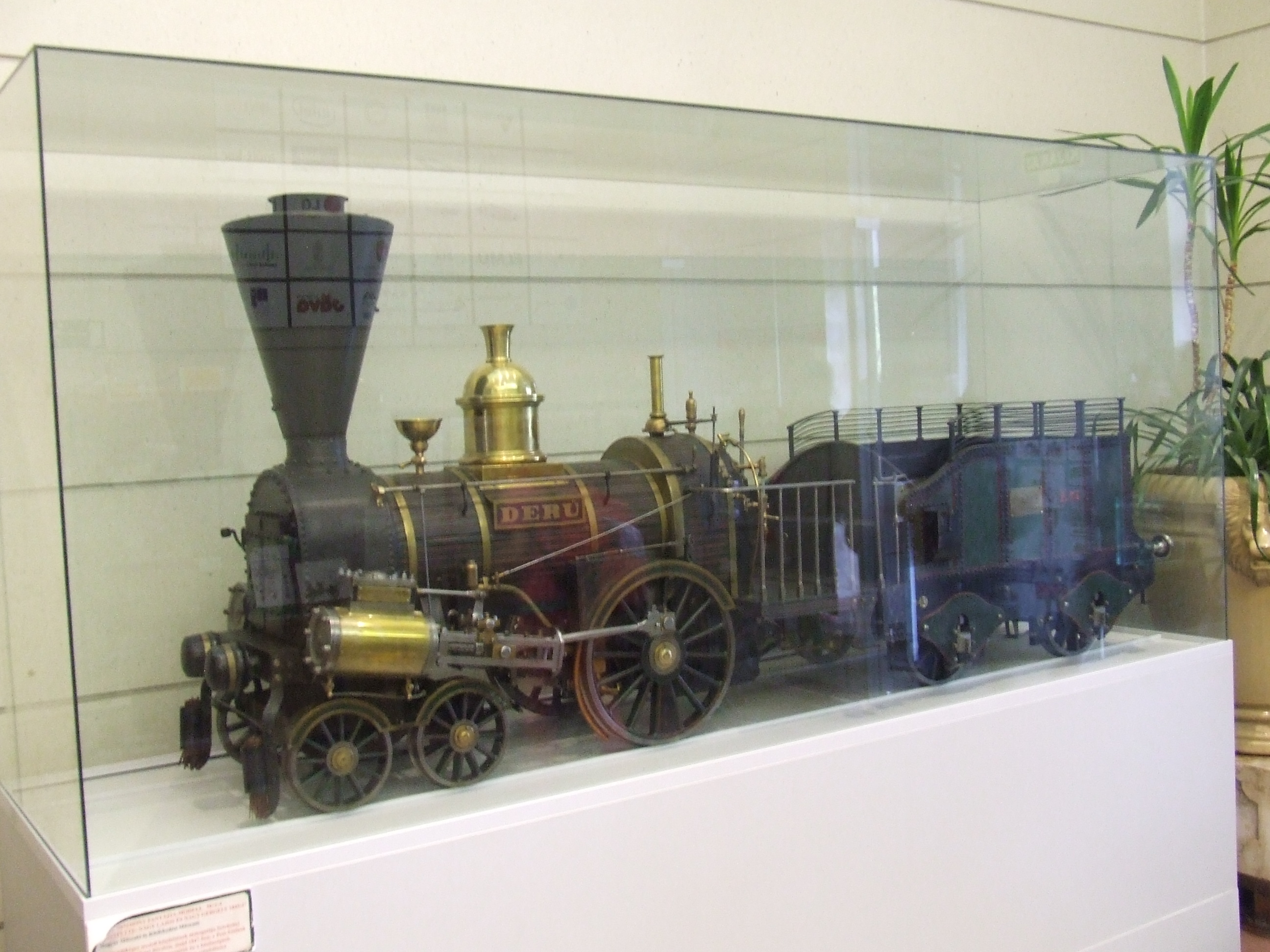
The „DERÜ” in Hungarian Museum of Transport (2015)

- Brothers Gergely Nagy and Lajos Nagy made a working steam locomotive model, name „DERÜ” (in English serenity, conviviality) in 1845–1847, they were unable to sell it and no further examples produced. (The model is now owned by the Hungarian Museum of Transport. In 1875, Ferenc Bognár added a mechanical vehicle.) Hungarian Railways (MÁVAG) purchased all of its locomotives from abroad (mostly from Austrian builders) prior to setting up shops for producing their own locomotives in the 1870's. However, they would continue to buy from other builders when their shops were at capacity.

=== Types discarded before the new 1911 numbering system ===
Picture	Serial number	Year of manufacture	Year of scrapping	Manufacturer	Quantity	Comment
	MKpV Pest	1845	1865	Cockerill	4	Two of the series were called „PEST” and „BUDA”. These were the first two locomotives purchased new for Hungarian Railways, with „BUDA” being delivered in 1845, followed by the „PEST” in 1846.
	MKpV Debreczen	1842	1860	Mayer, Mülhausen	1	The first locomotive to operate in Hungary, purchased used from the Austrian Northern State Railway
	MKpV Vácz	1846	1865	Cockerill	8	
	MKpV Béts	1846	1865	Lokomotivfabrik der StEG	1	
	MKpV Nádor és István	1846	1866	Norris, Wien	2	
	MKpV Czegléd	1847–1850	1876–1900	Lokomotivfabrik der StEG	14	
	MKpV Erős	1847	1879	Lokomotivfabrik der StEG	4	
	MKpV Nagy Körös, Villám és Csillag	1848–1854	1879–1913	Lokomotivfabrik der StEG, Wiener Neustädter Lokomotivfabrik	65 (?)	One of the most numerous locomotive types on the railway during its time.
	Ib	1857–1858	?–1905	Lokomotivfabrik der StEG	15	
	llc	1859	before 1910	Lokomotivfabrik der StEG	10	
	llq (NStB Wyschrad)	1847	1873–after 1891	Krauss-Maffei	7	
	llq (NStB Ossegg)	1850	?–1910	Lokomotivfabrik der StEG	9	
	llr (SöStB Bazin)	1851	1891–1897	Wiener Neustädter Lokomotivfabrik	4	
	llr (SöStB Marchegg)	1854	before 1891–1897	Lokomotivfabrik der StEG	10	
	lln	1892	1890s	Lokomotivfabrik der StEG	1	
	TIVa	1862–1867	before 1891–1910s	Lokomotivfabrik der StEG	4	
	VIIa	1893–1894	after 1920	Lokomotivfabrik Floridsdorf	2	Most sold to Romania.
	XIIIa	1880	before 1911	Atlas Locomotiv Work, Bristol	2	
	XIIa	1884–1886	after 1924	Krauss-Maffei	4	Many sold to Czechoslovakia.
	XIIb	1884	after 1897	Maschinenfabrik Christian Hagans, Erfurt	2	
	XIIc	1865	after 1894	Lokomotivfabrik der StEG	3	
	XIIe	1870–1873	1911	Lokomotivfabrik der StEG	5	
	XIIf	1871–1872	before 1911	Lokomotivfabrik der StEG	2	

=== Types that existed after the new numbering system in 1911 ===
Picture	Serial number	Year of manufacture	Year of scrapping	Manufacturer	Quantity	Comment
	10	1908	1952	MÁV Északi Főműhely	2	
	11 or 175	1910–1913	1939–1963	MÁVAG	31	
	12	1907	1924	MÁVAG	2	
	20	1881–1884	1920s	MÁVAG	27 (?)	One example operated as late as 1954.
	22	1928–1940	no data available	MÁVAG	148	
	40	1908–1909	no data available	Lokomotivfabrik Floridsdorf	7	
	41	1896–1900	1962	Lokomotivfabrik Floridsdorf	4	
	91	1915	1997	Krauss-Maffei, Linz	1	Fireless locomotive.
	150	1880–1884	1915–1922	Lokomotivfabrik Floridsdorf	6	
	201	1900	1920s	Hanomag	c. 100 (1 in Hungary)	The type is used in many surrounding countries.
	202	1900–1901	1930s–1940s	MÁVAG	2	
	203	1906–1908	1950	MÁVAG	24	
	220	1881–1905	1937–1952	MÁVAG	206	
	221	1883–1888	1920s	MÁVAG	40	
	222	1890–1904	1932–1951	MÁVAG, Lokomotivfabrik Floridsdorf, Wiener Neustädter Lokomotivfabrik, Lokomotivfabrik der StEG	95	
	223	1882–1891	1917–1957	Lokomotivfabrik der StEG	58	
	224	1898–1903	1930s–1952	MÁVAG, Lokomotivfabrik Floridsdorf, Wiener Neustädter Lokomotivfabrik, Lokomotivfabrik der StEG	58	
	225	1903–1907	1930s–1951	MÁVAG, Lokomotivfabrik Floridsdorf, Wiener Neustädter Lokomotivfabrik, Lokomotivfabrik der StEG	70	
	226	1882–1891	1930s–1950	Lokomotivfabrik Floridsdorf	20	
	227	1900–1902	1930s–1953	Lokomotivfabrik der StEG	16	
	236	1865–1867	after 1910s	Wiener Neustädter Lokomotivfabrik	7	
	237	1869–1872	1910s–1924	Krauss-Maffei	38	
	238	1869–1877	1910s–1934	Wiener Neustädter Lokomotivfabrik	58	
	239	1870–1872	after 1911	Karlsruhe	20	
	240	1872–1874	no data available	Wiener Neustädter Lokomotivfabrik	6	
	241	1886	1920s	MÁVAG	3	
	242	1936–1939	1961	MÁVAG	4	
	250	1865–1873	1909–1924	Lokomotivfabrik der StEG	almost 100	
	252	1862–1876	?–1913	Wiener Neustädter Lokomotivfabrik	29	
	253–254	1856–1859	1890–1915	Kaiser Ferdinands-Nordbahn	59	
	255	1859	after 1911	Wiener Neustädter Lokomotivfabrik	8	
	256	1860	after 1911	Wiener Neustädter Lokomotivfabrik	5	
	257	1868	?–1913	Krauss-Maffei	10	
	258	1868	after 1911	Wiener Neustädter Lokomotivfabrik	6	
	259	1874	1910s	Lokomotivfabrik der StEG	6	
	268	1863	1904–1913	Lokomotivfabrik der StEG	8	
	269	1856	1898–1912	Lokomotivfabrik der StEG	13	
	273	1891–1894	after 1946	Wiener Neustädter Lokomotivfabrik	3	
	274	1879	1927	Lokomotivfabrik der StEG	2	
	275	1928–1940	1980s (?)	MÁVAG	148	
	282	1883	after 1917	Hagans, Erfurt	2	
	283	1881	1921	Lokomotivfabrik Floridsdorf	2	
	284	1888–1894	1890s (?)–after 1945	MÁVAG	19	
	289	1898	1933–1938	Weitzer János Gép-, Waggongyár és Vasöntöde Rt.	6	
	290	1882	1961	Krauss München	1	Narrow gauge locomotive.
	291	1909	1961	Orenstein és Koppel Gépgyár	1	Narrow gauge locomotive.
	301	1911–1914	1966–1968	MÁVAG	20	
	302	1910–1930	1962–1969	Lokomotivfabrik der StEG	53	
	303	1951	1962	MÁVAG	2	
	314	1878–1879	1911 után	MÁVAG	2	
	315	1917–1918	1966–1972	MÁVAG	18	
	318	1954	no data available	VEB Lokomotivbau Karl Marx	1	
	319	1953	no data available	VEB Lokomotivbau Karl Marx	1	
	320	1892	1930s	MÁVAG	9	
	321	1897–1901	1927–1963	MÁVAG	18	
	322	1908–1909	1920s–1960	MÁVAG	40	
	323	1907–1909	1960s	Lokomotivfabrik Floridsdorf	178	
	324	1909–1943	1938–1981	MÁVAG	905	
	325	1892–1907	1920s–1960	MÁVAG	282	One example retained for industrial use, operating in 2017 at the Resavica Coal Mine.
	326	1882–1912	1960–1979	MÁVAG	522	
	327	1912–1914	1960s–1970s	MÁVAG	140	
	328	1919–1922	1964–1972	MÁVAG	177	
	329	1908	1949–1963	Lokomotivfabrik der StEG	10	
	330	1895–1908	1930s–1962	Wiener Neustädter Lokomotivfabrik	322	
	331	1902–1903	1933–1953	Wiener Neustädter Lokomotivfabrik	7	
	332	1860–1872	?–1953	Lokomotivfabrik der StEG	225	
	333	1884–1900	1940s	Lokomotivfabrik der StEG	73	
	334	1891–1902	1920s	Schweizerische Lokomotiv- und Maschinenfabrik	40	
	335	1869–1889	?–1961	Wiener Neustädter Lokomotivfabrik, MÁVAG	199 (?)	This was the (part) first Hungarian-made series of locomotives running on normal gauge. The first Hungarian-made steam locomotive was finally given the MÁV 335,001 (1873) track number during the subsequent conversions. After its scrapping, MÁV offered it to the Museum of Transport, but they refused the donation, citing a lack of space.
	336	1872	1920s	Wiener Neustädter Lokomotivfabrik	8	
	337	1872–1873	1920–1923	Lokomotivfabrik Floridsdorf	6	
	338	1874	no data available	Lokomotivfabrik der StEG	14	
	339	1890–1904	1930s–1964	Lokomotivfabrik der StEG	45	
	340	1877–1883	1932	Lokomotivfabrik der StEG	53	
	341	1882–1883	1950s	Wöhlert, Berlin	18	
	342	1915–1919	1972	MÁVAG	296	
	343	1903–1920	1930s–1950s	Lokomotivfabrik Floridsdorf	262	
	350	1882−1892	1927–1961	Lokomotivfabrik der StEG	62	
	351	1871–1891	no data available	Lokomotivfabrik Floridsdorf	58	
	355	1865–1869	1920s	Wiener Neustädter Lokomotivfabrik	10	
	356	1868	no data available	Lokomotivfabrik der StEG	9	
	357	1870	after 1911	Krauss-Maffei	6	
	358	1866–1876	1920s (?)	Lokomotivfabrik der StEG	102	
	359	1873	1923–1926	Wiener Neustädter Lokomotivfabrik	8	
	361	1884–1907	1930s–1950s	Lokomotivfabrik Floridsdorf	37	
	368	1856	1910s	Krauss-Maffei	18	
	369	1875−1886	1930s	Lokomotivfabrik der StEG	31	
	370	1898–1907	1950s	MÁVAG	139	
	373	1874	1920s	Mödlinger Lokomotivfabrik	6	
	374	1870–1898	no data available	Wiener Neustädter Lokomotivfabrik	c. 50	
	375	1907–1959	c. 1990s	MÁVAG	596	Last steam locomotive class to be built in Hungary.
	376	1910–1923	1940s–1975	MÁVAG	399	
	377	1885–1924	1930s–1950s	MÁVAG	549	
	380 and 382	1879–1891	1920s–1960s	Lokomotivfabrik der StEG	45	
	381	1882	?–1968	Krauss, München	4	
	383	1891–1892	after 1911	Lokomotivfabrik der StEG	4	
	384	1884	1924–1927	Krauss, München	12	
	387	1870–1897	1950–1963	Sigl Bécs, MÁVAG	4	3 + 1 (two different types).
	389	1886–1899	1952–1968	Sigl, Weitzer, Arad	6	
	390	before 1920	1960s	Maffei, Henshel, Borsig	3	
	391	no data available	after 1945	Oremstein and Koppel, Krauss Linz	3	
	392	1884–1908	?–1965	Oremstein and Koppel	2	
	394	1915–1949	?–1966	MÁVAG	2	
	395	1895–1922	1960s–1982	Lokomotivfabrik der StEG, Krauss Linz	12	
	398	no data available	no data available	no data available	1	
	399	1898–1924	1960s	Krauss, Linz, MÁVAG	19	
	401	1905–1908	?–1969	MÁVAG	15	
	402	1927	no data available	MÁVAG	2	
	403	1917–1930	1960s–1970s	several different companies	265 (?)	
	404	1930	1970s	Borsig, Berlin	30	The type is used in many surrounding countries.
	410	1902–1924	1960s	several different companies	c. 5000	
	411	1942–1945	1950s–1980s	ALCO, Baldwin, Lima	510	USATC S160 Class, 484 placed into service, remainder used for parts.
	420	1882–1891	1949–1953	several different companies	46	
	421	1894–1896	after 1945	MÁVAG	35	
	422	1898–1902	1934–1958	MÁVAG	30	
	424	1924–1958	1980s	MÁVAG	365	
	431	1893–1917	1950s–1966	several different companies	1002	Steam locomotives of various origins.
	434	1882–1895	1928	Maffei, München; SLM, Winterthur	36	
	441	1870–1874	?–after 1945	Wiener Neustädter Lokomotivfabrik	35	
	442	1917–1920	1972	MÁVAG	30	
	450	1879–1891	1930s–1965	Lokomotivfabrik der StEG	13	
	459	1868−1880	1920s–1958	Lokomotivfabrik der StEG	135	
	459II	1873–1874	?–1960	Lokomotivfabrik Floridsdorf, Maschinenfabrik Esslingen AG, Wiener Neustädter Lokomotivfabrik	34	
	460	1921–1946	?–1980	Českomoravská–Kolben–Daněk	231	
	475	1896–1902	1930s–1954	MÁVAG	41	
	476	1885–1912	?–1962	Lokomotivfabrik der StEG	23	
	477	1908–1909	1950s–1972	Lokomotivfabrik der StEG	16	
	485	1920s	?–1970	MÁVAG	15	
	490	1906–1950	after 1960s	MÁVAG	142	Narrow gauge locomotive.
	491	1908	no data available	O&K	2	Narrow gauge locomotive.
	492	1908–1926	?–1970	MÁVAG	26	Narrow gauge locomotive.
	493	1906–1926	?–1970	Maffei, O&K, Krauss Linz	8	Narrow gauge locomotive.
	494	1912–1924	after 1945	Krauss, Krauss Linz, Orenstein&Koppel	8	Narrow gauge locomotive.
	496	1954	no data available	MÁVAG	5	Narrow gauge locomotive.
	498	1916–1917	after 1945	Hen. Bors, Schw, O&K	7<	Narrow gauge locomotive.
	499	1899–1923	?–1963	MÁVAG	8	Narrow gauge locomotive.
	501	1943–1949	1962–1995	no data available	1061	The type is used in many surrounding countries.
	510	1912–1924	after 1950s	Luhanskteplovoz	c. 14.000	The type is used in many surrounding countries.
	520	1942–1950	1962–1988	no data available	6700<	The type is used in many surrounding countries.
	601	1914–1921	1950s–1960	MÁVAG	63	
	651	1909–1919	1940s–1957	MÁVAG	45	

== Diesel locomotives ==
Picture	Serial number	Year of manufacture	Year of scrapping	Manufacturer	Quantity	Comment
	M28	1955–1959	no data available	Rába Járműgyár, Győr	20	
	M30	1950	1960	Jungenthal	1	
	M31	1958–1960	no data available	Ganz–MÁVAG, Budapest	53	
	M32	1972–1974	no data available	Ganz–MÁVAG, Budapest	56	
	M38	1960–1961	mid. 70s (in part only)	Rába Járműgyár, Győr	7	There is only 2 locomotive left today.
	M40	1963–1970	after 1990s	Ganz–MÁVAG, Budapest	73	
	M41	1972–1984	after 2016	Ganz–MÁVAG, Budapest	104	
	M42	1994	no data available	Ganz-Hunslet	1	
	M43	1974–1979	after 2010s	Uzinele 23 August. Romania, Bucharest.	35 (just in Hungary)	The type is used in many surrounding countries.
	M44	1954–1971	no data available	Ganz–MÁVAG, Budapest	c. 600	The type is used in many surrounding countries.
	M46	1961–1964	1975–1981	Ganz–MÁVAG, Budapest	7	There is only 1 locomotive left today.
	M47	1974–1979	no data available	Augusztus 23. Művek, Bukarest	c. 80 (just in Hungary)	The type is used in many surrounding countries.
	M61	1963–1964	1989–2001	Nydqvist och Holm Aktiebolag	19	
	M62	1965–1974	after 1980s	Luhanskteplovoz	82 (just in Hungary)	The type is used in many surrounding countries.
	M63	1970–1975	1987–1990	Ganz–MÁVAG, Budapest	10	There is only 1 locomotive left today.

== Electric locomotives ==
Picture	Serial number	Year of manufacture	Year of scrapping	Manufacturer	Quantity	Comment
	V40	1932–1940	1967	Ganz Villamossági Gyár, Budapest	29	
	V60	1932–1936	1967	Ganz Villamossági Gyár, Budapest	3	
	V41	1958–1962	after 1969	Ganz–MÁVAG, Budapest + Klement Gottwald Villamossági Gyár	30	
	V42	1961–1966	1990s	Ganz–MÁVAG, Budapest + Klement Gottwald Villamossági Gyár	42	
	V43	1963–1982	no data available	Ganz–MÁVAG, Budapest	323	
	V44	1943–1944	1953	Ganz-MÁVAG, Budapest	2	Experimental vehicle.
	V45	1967	It was converted to V43 in 1969.	Ganz–MÁVAG, Budapest	1	Experimental vehicle.
	V46	1983–1992	no data available	Ganz–MÁVAG, Budapest	60	
	V50	1923	no data available	Ganz–MÁVAG, Budapest	1	Experimental vehicle.
	V51	1911	1951	Ringhoffer, Siemens–Schuckert	4	
	V55	1950–1957	1960s	Ganz–MÁVAG, Budapest	12	
	V63	1974–1988	1996–today	Ganz–MÁVAG, Budapest	52	
	2BB2 400	1926	1941–1945	Ganz Villamossági Gyár, Budapest	2	Experimental vehicle.
	470 (after the 2010 renames)	2002–2006		Siemens TS, Krauss-Maffei	15	
	471 (after the 2010 renames)	2017–		Siemens Mobility	9	
	480 (after the 2010 renames)	2010–2012		Bombardier, Kassel	25	
	1014 (after the 2010 renames)	1993–1994	2016	SGP, ELIN	18	
	1116 (after the 2010 renames)	2000–2006		Siemens TS, Krauss-Maffei	282	

== Narrow gauge locomotives ==
For used narrow gauge locomotives, see: kisvasut.hu

The list above nevertheless includes steam locomotives designed for narrow gauge.

== Interesting ==
- Several steam locomotives are still in use on the Banovic Coal Mine line (Bosnia and Herzegovina) today. Several of them may be made in Hungary. In Bosnia and Herzegovina, several other steam locomotives are used, which may also be of Hungarian origin (or the type used in the list above).

== Preserved steam locomotives ==
Although not all types of diesel and electric locomotives (no longer in use today) have been preserved, most of them are visible specimens. This is not the case for steam locomotives used in Hungary. There were a number of types (see list above) that were not left to fend for themselves. Of the (approximately) 140 types at that time – according to József Soltész, a train expert at the Museum of Transport (2009) – „ten thousand steam locomotives ran in the country, and now one hundred and fifty of them have been preserved.” Of these, barely 25 are operational.

- List of steam locomotives remaining in Hungary

== Locomotive museums in Hungary, storage locations ==
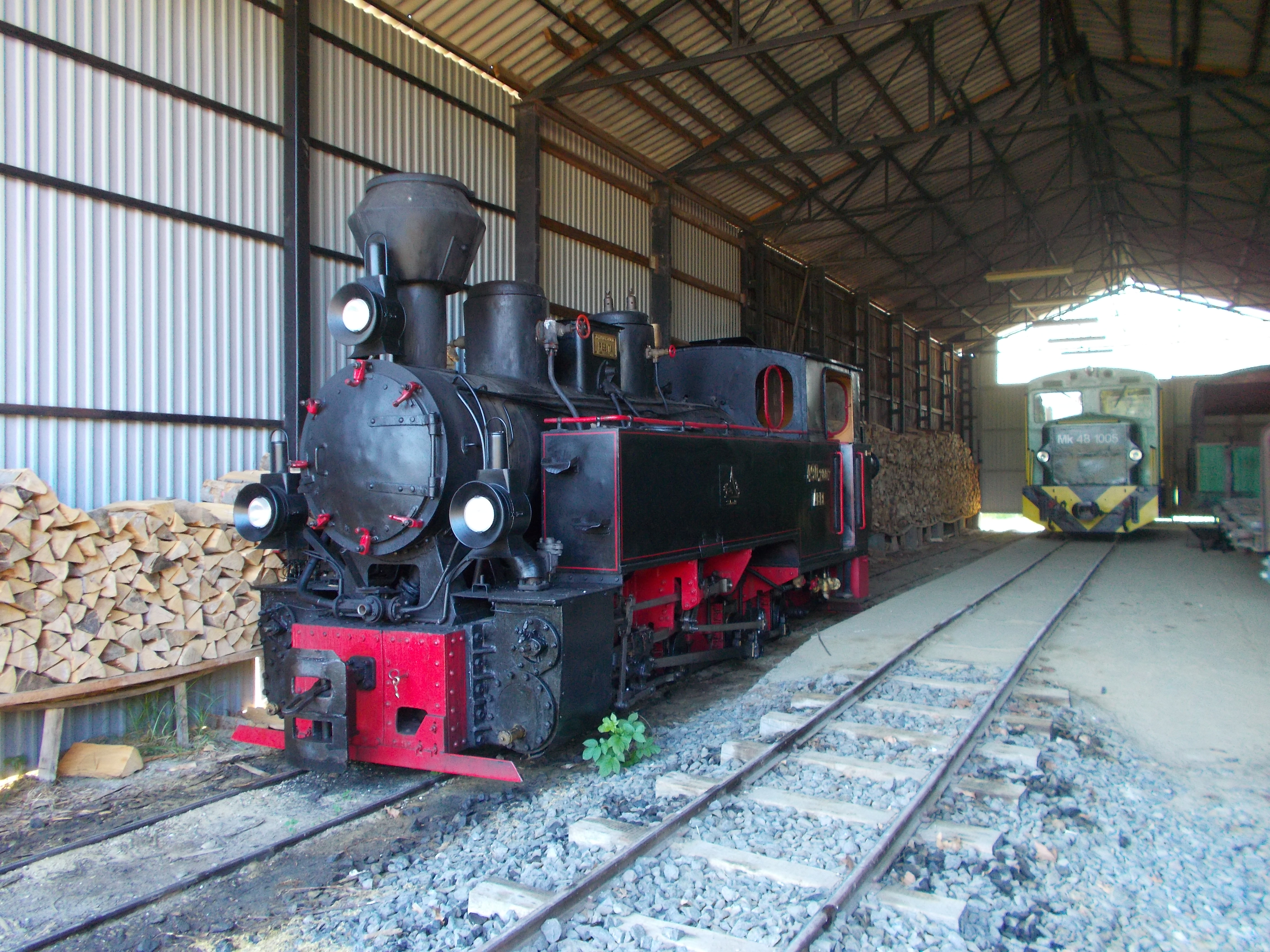
A steam locomotive in Csömödéri Állami Erdei Vasút

- Hungarian Technical and Transportation Museum, Budapest (under construction)
- Hungarian Railway History Park, Budapest
- Urban Public Transport Museum, Szentendre
- Railway Main Workshop in Istvántelek, Budapest
- issued some specimens at railway stations
- in railway repair halls

== Other places of use ==
- in use on normal gauge lines (steam locomotives only as a nostalgia)
- in use on narrow gauge lines (steam locomotives only as a nostalgia, there is no electric locomotive in such a place)

== Other articles ==
- List of steam locomotives remaining in Hungary

== Sources ==
- MÁV steam locomotives

== Literature ==
- A magyar keskeny nyomtávolságú gőzmozdonygyártás helye, szerepe a magyar ipar történetében
- Soltész József: A Magyar Középponti Vasút első mozdonyai. In: A Közlekedési Múzeum Évkönyve 13. 2001–2002. Budapest, 2003.
- Czére Béla: A magyar vasút képekben, Magyar Államvasutak, Budapest, 1972
- Villányi György. Gőzmotorkocsik és kismozdonyok. Magyar Államvasutak Rt. (1996)
- Villányi György. A Magyar Államvasutak vontatójárműveinek jelölési- és pályaszámrendszerei, Vasúthistória Évkönyv. Közlekedési Dokumentációs Vállalat. ISSN 0238-6550 (2003)
- Lányi Ernő, Lovász István, Mohay László, Szontágh Gáspár, Villányi György. Nagyvasúti Vontatójárművek Magyarországon. Közlekedési Dokumentációs Vállalat (1984). ISBN 963-552-161-8
- Mezei István, Lovas József. MÁV Vontatójármű Album 1868-1993. KÖZDOK (1994). ISBN 963-552-289-4
- Magyar Vasúttörténet I–VII. Közlekedési Dokumentációs Kft., Budapest, 1995–1999 ISBN 963-552-311-4
- Pottyondy Tihamér: A magyar államvasutak mozdonyparkja, mozdonyainak szerkezeti fejlődése és a modern mozdonytipusok. A magyar államvasutak gépészeti műszaki közlései. Kézirat, 1918. november.
- Fialovits Béla: A M.Á.V. gőzmozdonyainak történeti fejlődése X. Technika 1943.
- Mezei István. Mozdonyok, Móra Könyvkiadó, Budapest, 1984, ISBN 963-11376-3-5
- Heller György: Magyar Vasúttörténeti Park született! Egy, évtizedeken át folytatott küzdelem története, Magyar Államvasutak Részvénytársaság, Budapest, 2000, ISBN 963-00-3100-0
- Holcsik Ferenc – Villányi György: Magyar Vasúttörténeti Park, Magyar Államvasutak Részvénytársaság, Budapest, 2002, ISBN 963-7085-80-7
- 25 éves a MÁV História Bizottsága – 10 éves a Magyar Vasúttörténeti Park Alapítvány / A MÁV História Bizottság kibővített, ünnepélyes ülése, Magyar Vasúttörténeti Park, 2009. október 8., Magyar Vasúttörténeti Park Alapítvány, Budapest, 2009
- (szerk.) Kovács László: Magyar vasúttörténet 1846-2000, Magyar Államvasutak Részvénytársaság, Budapest, 2000, ISBN 963-03-8369-1
- Urbán Lajos: Vasúti nagylexikon I-II., MÁV RT., 2005, ISBN 9632041216
- (szerk.) Mezei István: 150 éves a magyar vasút 1846-1996, MÁV Rt., Budapest, 1996
- Magyarország mozdonyai, Indóház Lap- és Könyvkiadó, Budapest, 2007, ISBN 978-963-06-3174-7

== Hungarian journals dealing with locomotives ==
- Indóház (iho.hu)
- Vasút
- Vasútvilág
- Vasutasvilág
- Vasutas Magazin
- Vasutas Hírlap
- Vasút & Modell
- A vasút világa
- Vasútgépészet
- Magyar vasutas
- MÁV almanach
- Sínek Világa
- Pályaőr
- A Magyar Államvasutak Hivatalos Lapja
- A Magyar Államvasutak Rt. Értesítője
