= MÁV Class V55 =

Hungarian electric locomotive

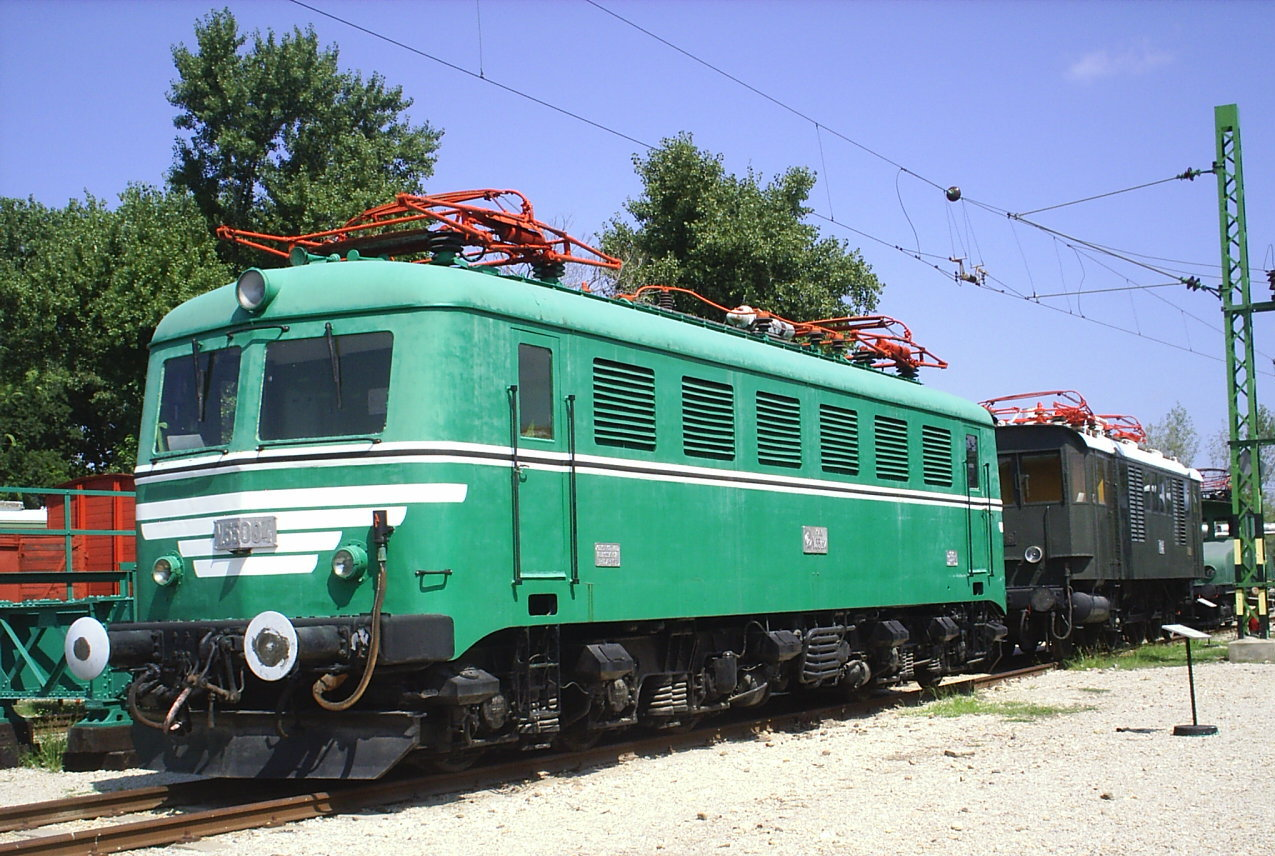
- MÁV Class V55.004, Hungarian Railway Museum
Type and origin
- Power type: Electric locomotive
- Builder: Ganz
- Build date: 1950–1957
- Total produced: 12
Specifications
- Configuration
  - UIC: 'Bo'Co
- Gauge: 1,435 mm (4 ft 8 1/2 in)
- Wheel diameter: 1,040 mm (3 ft 5 in)
- Length: 14,600 mm (47 ft 11 in)
- Width: 3,000 mm (9 ft 10 in)
- Height: 4,650 mm (15 ft 3 in)
- Loco weight: 92.5 t (204,000 lb)
- Electric system/s: 16kV 50 Hz AC
- Traction motors: 5
Performance figures
- Maximum speed: 125 km/h
- Power output: 2,354 kW (3,157 hp)
- Tractive effort
  - Starting: 240 kN (54,000 lb_{f})
  - Continuous: 160 kN (36,000 lb_{f})

The MÁV Class V55 was a series of phase- and frequency-converting electric locomotives with a Bo'Co' wheel arrangement, supplied to MÁV. Its nickname was "Bocó." Developed based on the MÁV Class V44 prototype, the type was suitable for both express passenger and freight service; the use of standardized parts and uniform locomotives simplified operations.

== History ==
During World War II, several Kandó locomotives (MÁV Class V40–V60) were damaged or ended up abroad. Furthermore, the existing fleet could no longer meet increased demands—such as the electrification of new sections and higher hauling requirements—in terms of either power output or top speed, and the side-rod drive mechanism required significant maintenance. For these reasons, MÁV ordered the Class V55 locomotives from the Ganz-MÁVAG factory in 1948. A total of 12 units were built between 1950 and 1957. The first two units featured a different design: the machine room was illuminated by round side windows, and gangway doors were installed on the front ends. The class began to be withdrawn from service as early as the 1960s due to inadequate operational reliability. Today, a single unit—V55.004—is on display at the Hungarian Railway Museum. MÁV operated the Class V55 locomotives (like the Class V40) until 1967.

== Structure ==
The electrical equipment of the locomotives—designed for hauling both passenger and freight trains—was fundamentally identical to that of the MÁV Class V44 locomotives. The primary differences between the two locomotive types lay in the vehicle structure and the design of the traction motors. Each axle was driven by an individual traction motor mounted within the bogies. The shaft of the frequency converter was driven by the phase converter. Distinctive features of the locomotive's structure included an asymmetrical running gear arrangement (one bogie having two axles and the other three) and a locomotive body equipped with two driver's cabs. The five-axle configuration ensured a sufficiently low axle load to allow the locomotive to travel at high speeds, even when negotiating curves. Regarding the power conversion machinery, the incoming single-phase 16 kV 50 Hz supply voltage was first converted into three-phase 50 Hz voltage by the phase converter, after which the frequency converter adjusted the frequency according to the required operating conditions. The frequency converter formed a single machine set with the phase converter and the exciter, sharing a common shaft and housing. Oil cooling was employed for the stator, while water cooling was used for the rotor. The pumps circulating the oil and water, as well as the cooling fan for the oil and water systems, were all driven by the shaft of the machine set.

== See also ==
- List of Hungarian locomotives
- List of railway electrification systems
