= MÁV Class V46 =

Hungarian electric locomotive

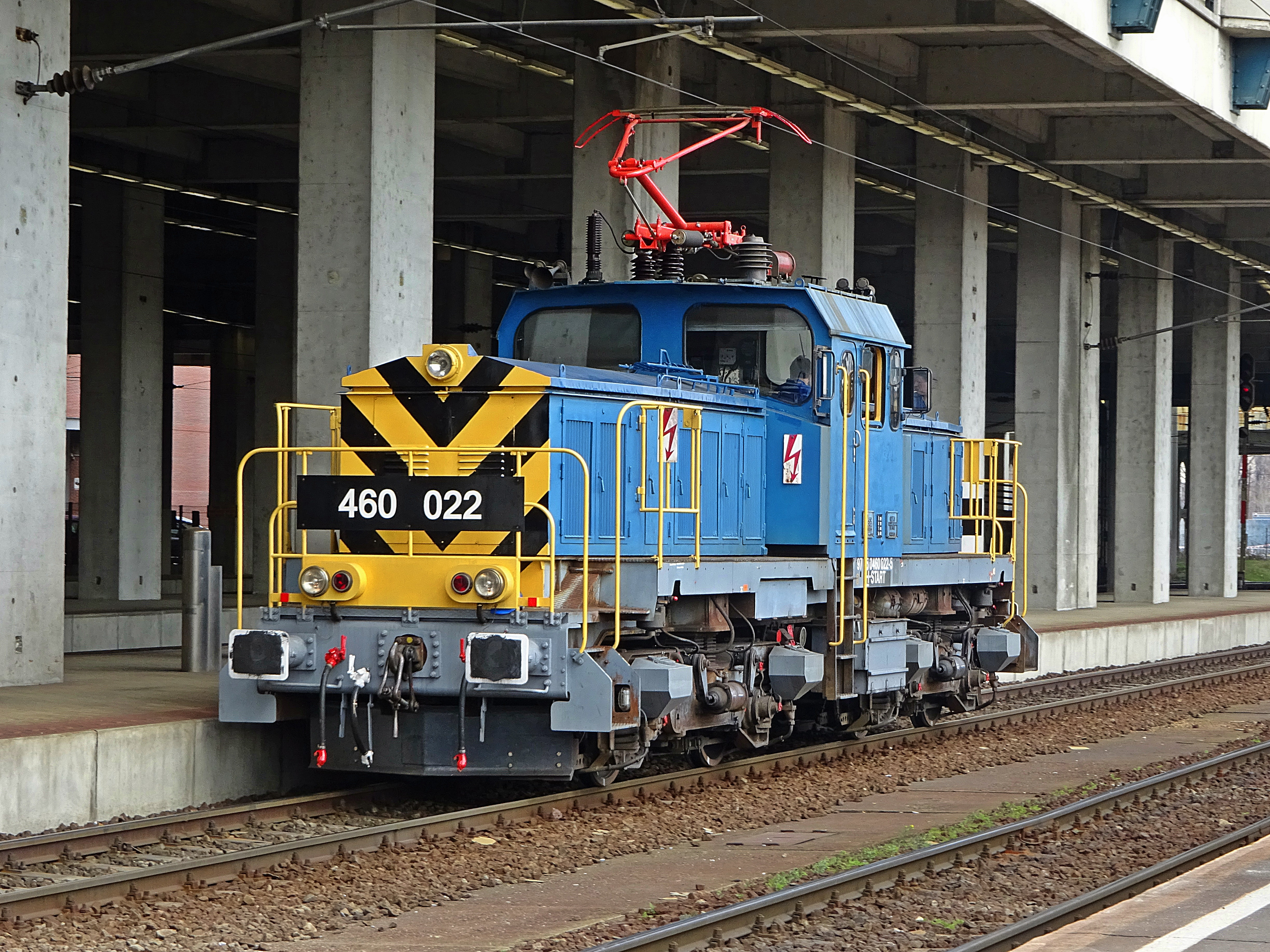
- MÁV Class V46
Type and origin
- Power type: Electric locomotive
- Builder: Ganz
- Build date: 1983–1992
- Total produced: 60
Specifications
- Configuration
  - UIC: B'B'
- Gauge: 1,435 mm (4 ft 8 1/2 in)
- Wheel diameter: 1,040 mm (3 ft 5 in)
- Length: 14,400 mm (47 ft 3 in)
- Width: 3,116 mm (10 ft 2.7 in)
- Height: 4,550 mm (14 ft 11 in)
- Loco weight: 80 t (180,000 lb)
- Electric system/s: 25 kV 50 Hz AC
- Traction motors: 4
Performance figures
- Maximum speed: 80 km/h
- Power output: 820 kW (1,100 hp)
- Tractive effort
  - Starting: 266 kN (60,000 lb_{f})
  - Continuous: 146 kN (33,000 lb_{f})

The MÁV Class V46 series is the most numerous class of thyristor electric shunting locomotives delivered to MÁV (Hungarian State Railways) between 1983 and 1992. Its nickname is "Szöcske". Under the new numbering system introduced in 2011, it is designated as the 460 series.

== Background ==
Hungary has traditionally relied on imports for its crude oil needs; consequently, the use of diesel-powered traction units was often uneconomical or merely a forced solution. Due to the 1973 oil crisis and subsequent unfavorable fluctuations in oil prices, the Hungarian State Railways examined ways to perform shunting operations more cost-effectively in the early 1980s. The requirement for an shunting locomotive was met by a machine designed and manufactured by Ganz–MÁVAG.

== History ==
MÁV ordered the V46 locomotive series to replace diesel locomotives used for shunting at electrified marshalling yards; however, these electric locomotives proved highly effective in handling freight traffic between Budapest stations, hauling lighter freight trains around major junctions, and performing passenger carriage shunting tasks at passenger stations. Although they lack train heating capabilities, they are also used on shorter passenger trains during the summer season. Thanks to its ability to handle a wide range of tasks, the V46 became one of the most successful locomotive series produced by the Ganz–MÁVAG factory.

The first five locomotives were built in 1983, followed by batches of 15 in 1986, 25 in 1988, and 15 in 1991. As of 2016, every unit of the 60-strong series remained part of the MÁV fleet.

Thanks to its successful design, not a single unit has been scrapped to date. Nevertheless, more than half of the fleet has been inactive since 2019.

== See also ==
- List of Hungarian locomotives
