= MÁV Class V42 =

Hungarian electric locomotive

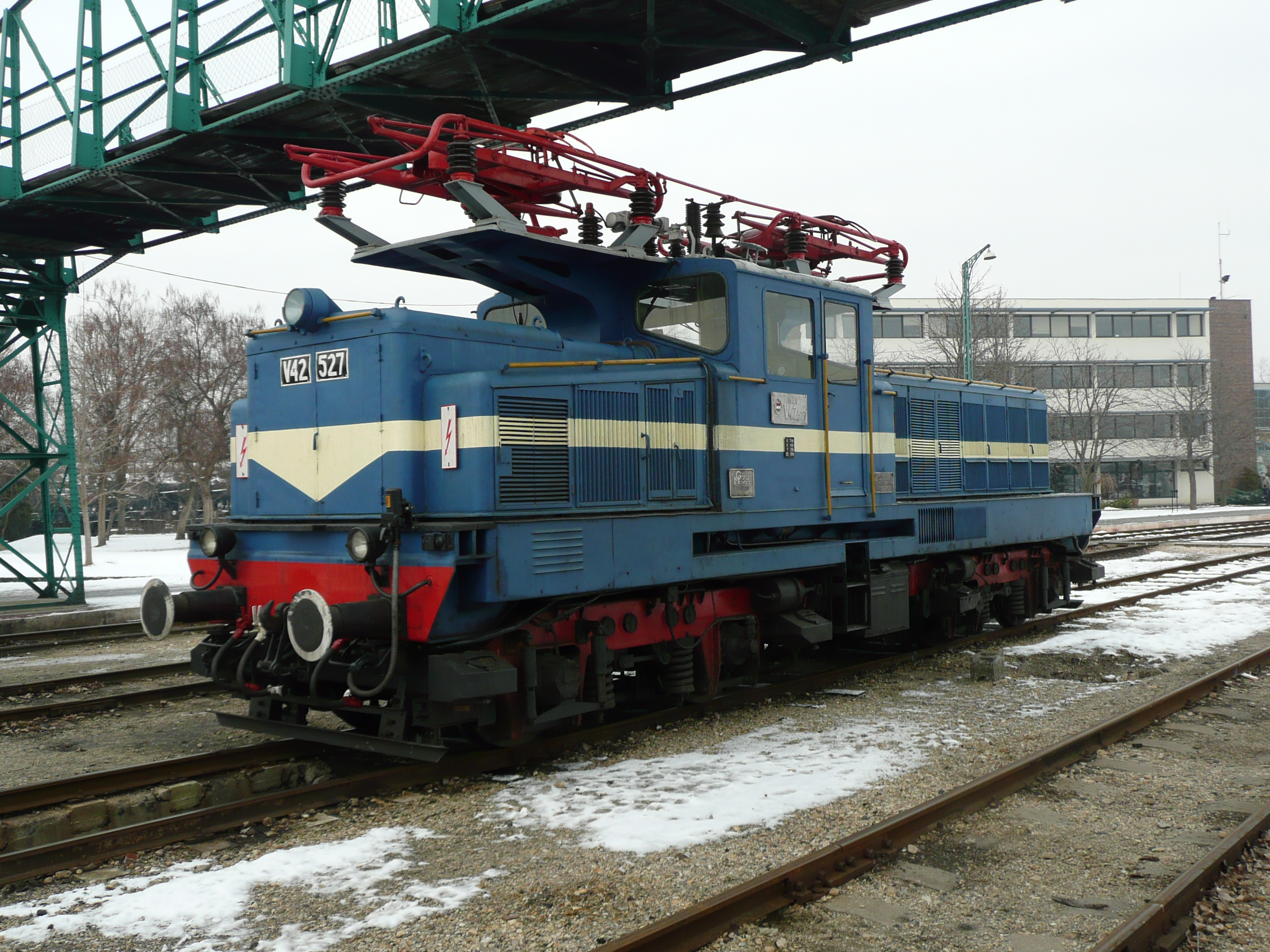
- MÁV Class V42.527, Budapest 2010
Type and origin
- Power type: Electric locomotive
- Builder: Ganz
- Build date: 1961–1966
- Total produced: 42 (V42.501–542)
Specifications
- Configuration
  - UIC: B'B'
- Gauge: 1,435 mm (4 ft 8 1/2 in)
- Wheel diameter: 1,040 mm (3 ft 5 in)
- Length: 12,290 mm (40 ft 4 in)
- Width: 3,150 mm (10 ft 4 in)
- Height: 3,755 mm (12 ft 3.8 in)
- Loco weight: 74 t (163,000 lb)
- Electric system/s: 16/25 kV 50 Hz AC
- Traction motors: 4
Performance figures
- Maximum speed: 80 km/h
- Power output: 1,215 kW (1,629 hp)
- Tractive effort
  - Starting: 235 kN (53,000 lb_{f})
  - Continuous: 158 kN (36,000 lb_{f})

The MÁV Class V42 is a class of dual-voltage electric locomotives supplied to MÁV. Its nickname is "Leó".

== History ==
Production began in 1961, and 42 units were built by 1966. Structurally, the vehicle is identical to the MÁV Class V41 locomotives; however, the main machinery group has higher power output and a lower rotational speed, and a single main generator was installed instead of two. Initially, they hauled freight trains between Tatabánya and Oroszlány, between Miskolc and Diósgyőr, and on the Budapest orbital railway; they also operated push-pull trains—using BDt 200 control cars—on the Budapest–Komárom, Budapest–Hatvan, Budapest–Cegléd–Szolnok, and Budapest–Vác–Szob lines. During push-pull operations, the driver controlled the locomotive from the control car, though an assistant operator was also present on the locomotive itself. Later, they performed light freight duties and eventually served as station shunting locomotives. The class was retired in the early 1990s; several locomotives were converted into electric heating units.

== Structure ==
The main transformer steps down the overhead line voltage to approximately 1000 V. It powers a single-phase, six-pole synchronous motor, which—at a synchronous speed of 1000 rpm—drives a ten-pole DC main generator. The direct current generated by the main generator powers the DC traction motors located in the bogies. For the auxiliary systems, the main transformer powers a Ferraris-Arno motor that drives the excitation dynamos and—acting as a phase converter—supplies electricity to the three-phase auxiliary motors. A unique feature is that, thanks to the Ward-Leonard drive, the locomotive can coast or even start moving with its pantograph lowered for short distances; the V41 class shared this capability.

== Present day ==
A few retired locomotives are used as stationary train-heating units. Locomotive V42.527 has been hauling heritage runs, special trains, and occasionally work trains since late 2008. Locomotive V42.527 was originally exhibited at the Hungarian Railway Museum in its final livery before being moved to the Northern Vehicle Repair Depot in 2005. Subsequently, between 2008 and 2022, it hauled heritage trains on an occasional basis while remaining in operational condition. Since then, it has been forced out of service indefinitely due to a main transformer failure.

== See also ==
- List of Hungarian locomotives
