= Urban Public Transport Museum =

Transport museum in Szentendre, Hungary

- Városi Tömegközlekedési Múzeum
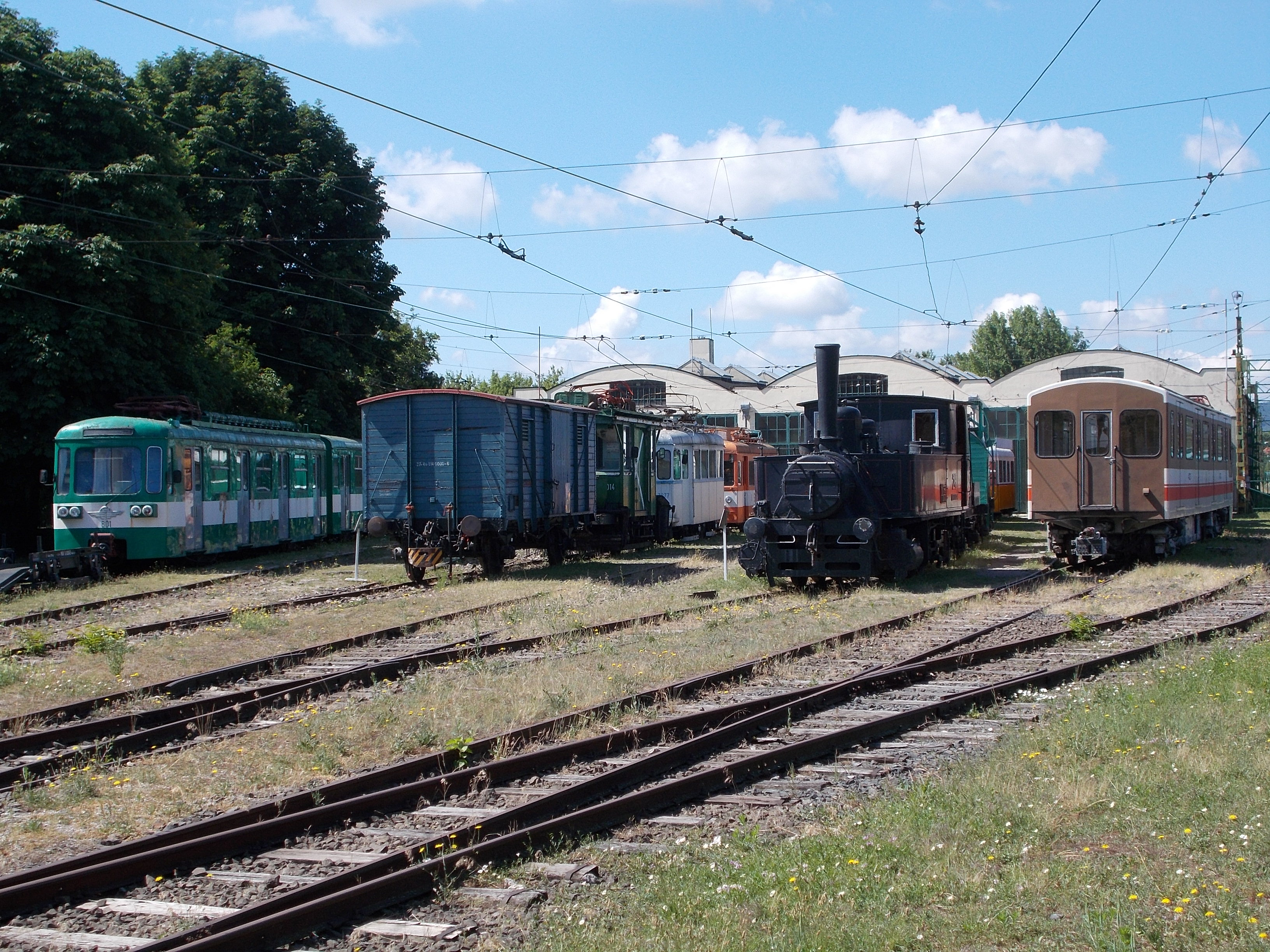
- Some of the vehicles on display are in the garden area of the museum
- Established: July 14, 1992
- Location: Szentendre, Hungary
- Coordinates: 47.6594°N 19.0739°E
- Type: transport museum
- Owner: Budapesti Közlekedési Zrt.
- Website: www.bkv.hu/en/museums/urban_public_transport_museum_szentendre

The Urban Public Transport Museum of the Budapesti Közlekedési Zrt. is located in Szentendre, Hungary. The museum opened on July 14, 1992, with five exhibition halls and two showrooms, as well as an open exhibition space in front of the halls. It is open every year from April to October, the entrance fee is one line ticket for adults and one metro ticket for children and pensioners. It is next to the H5 HÉV terminus and the local Volánbusz bus station.

== Building ==
Originally built as a HÉV depot during the electrification of the Szentendre HÉV line in 1914, the building became unable able to perform its function by the 1990s, so when the HÉV line was modernized in 1991–1992, a permanent exhibition about the Hungarian capital's public transport was created in the depot building. It opened as a museum on July 14, 1992.

== Gallery ==
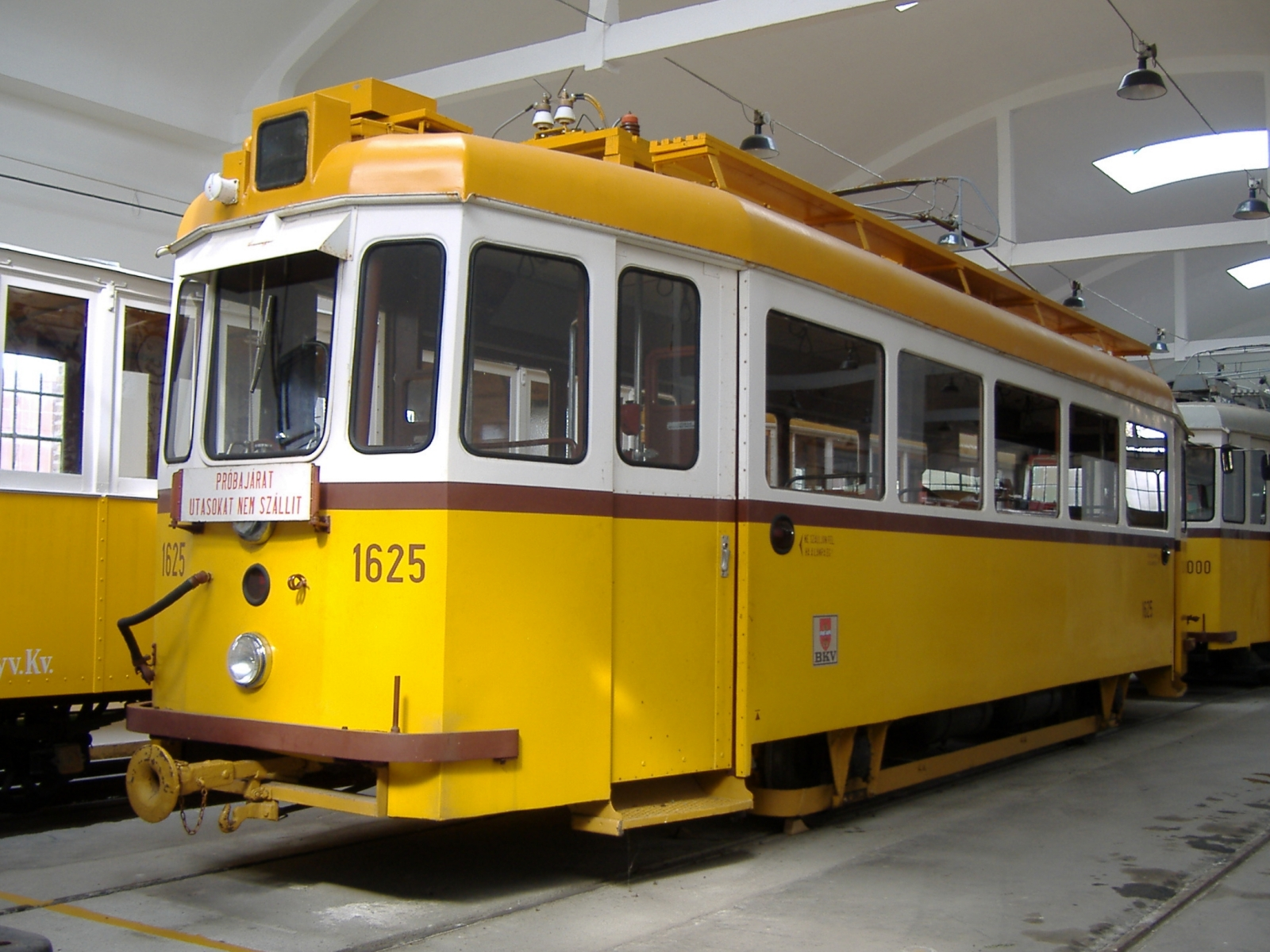

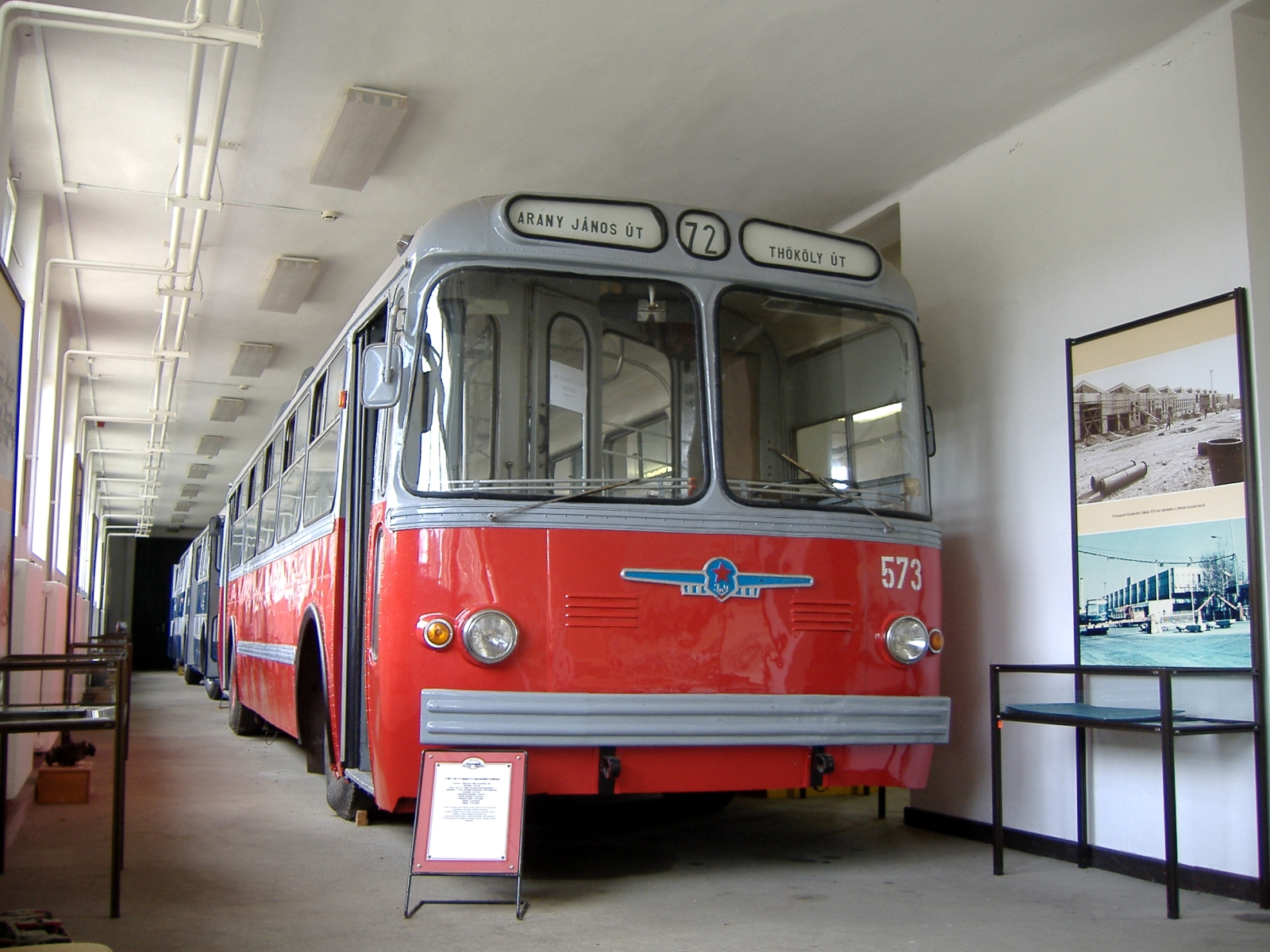

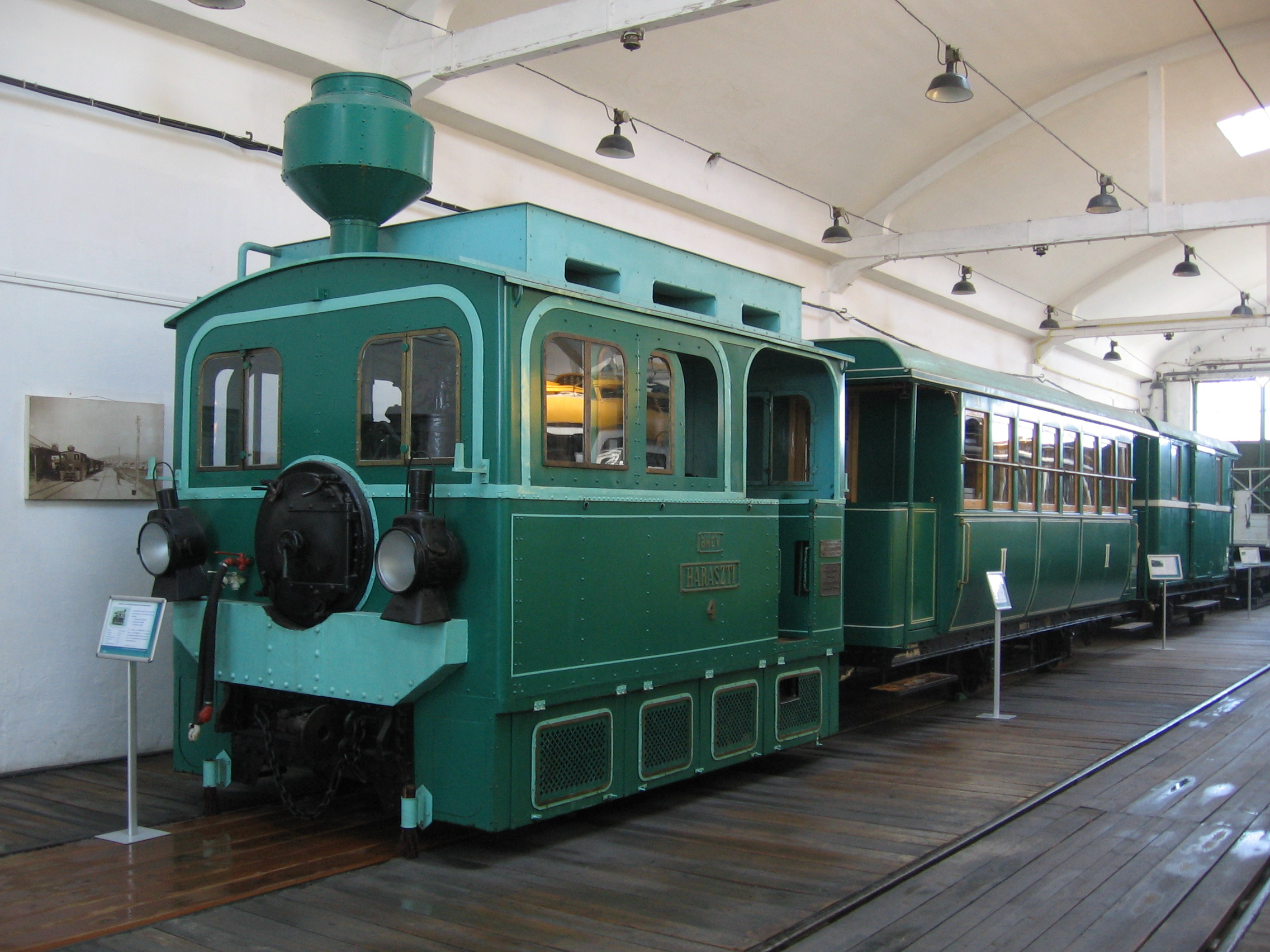

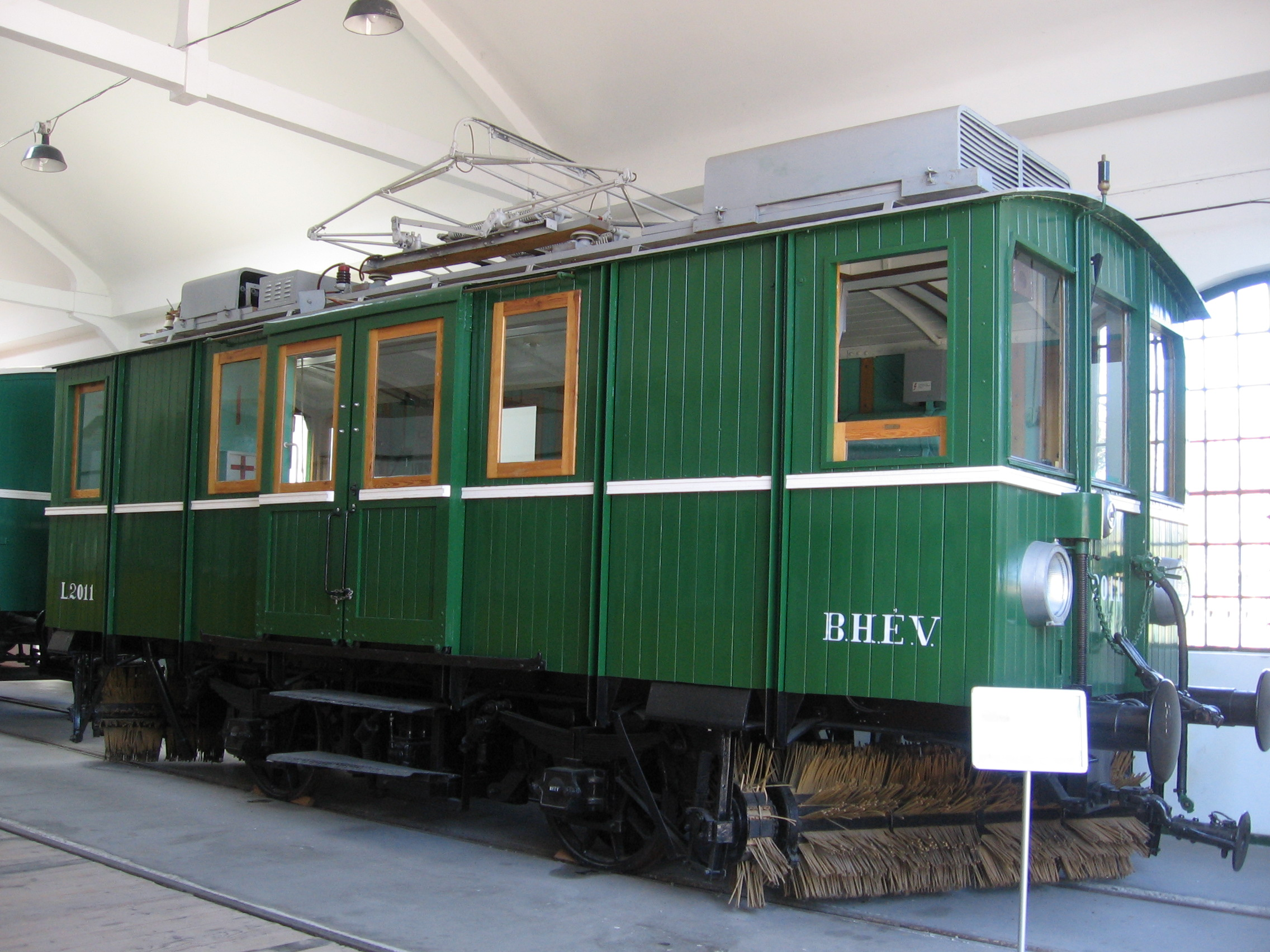

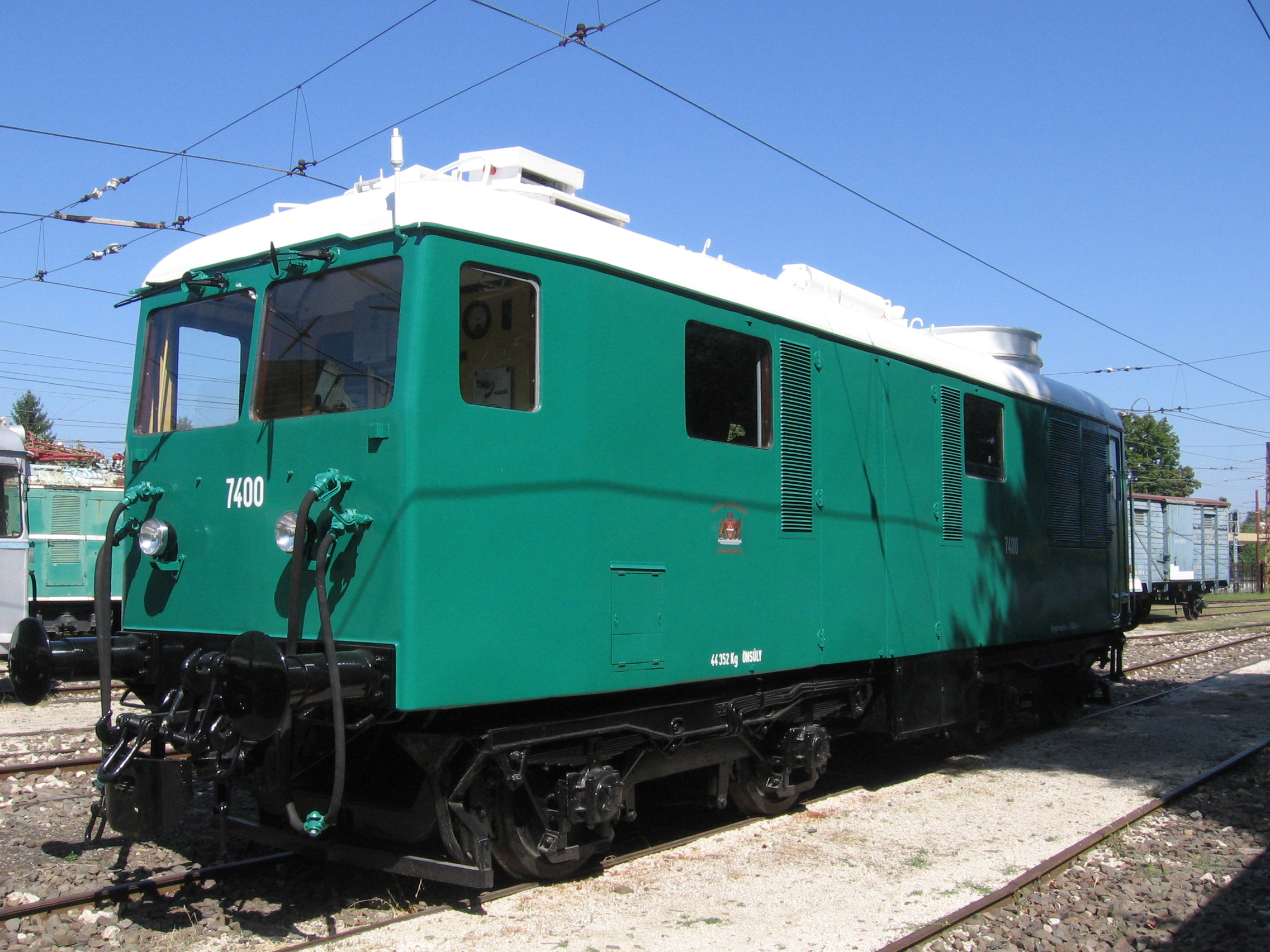

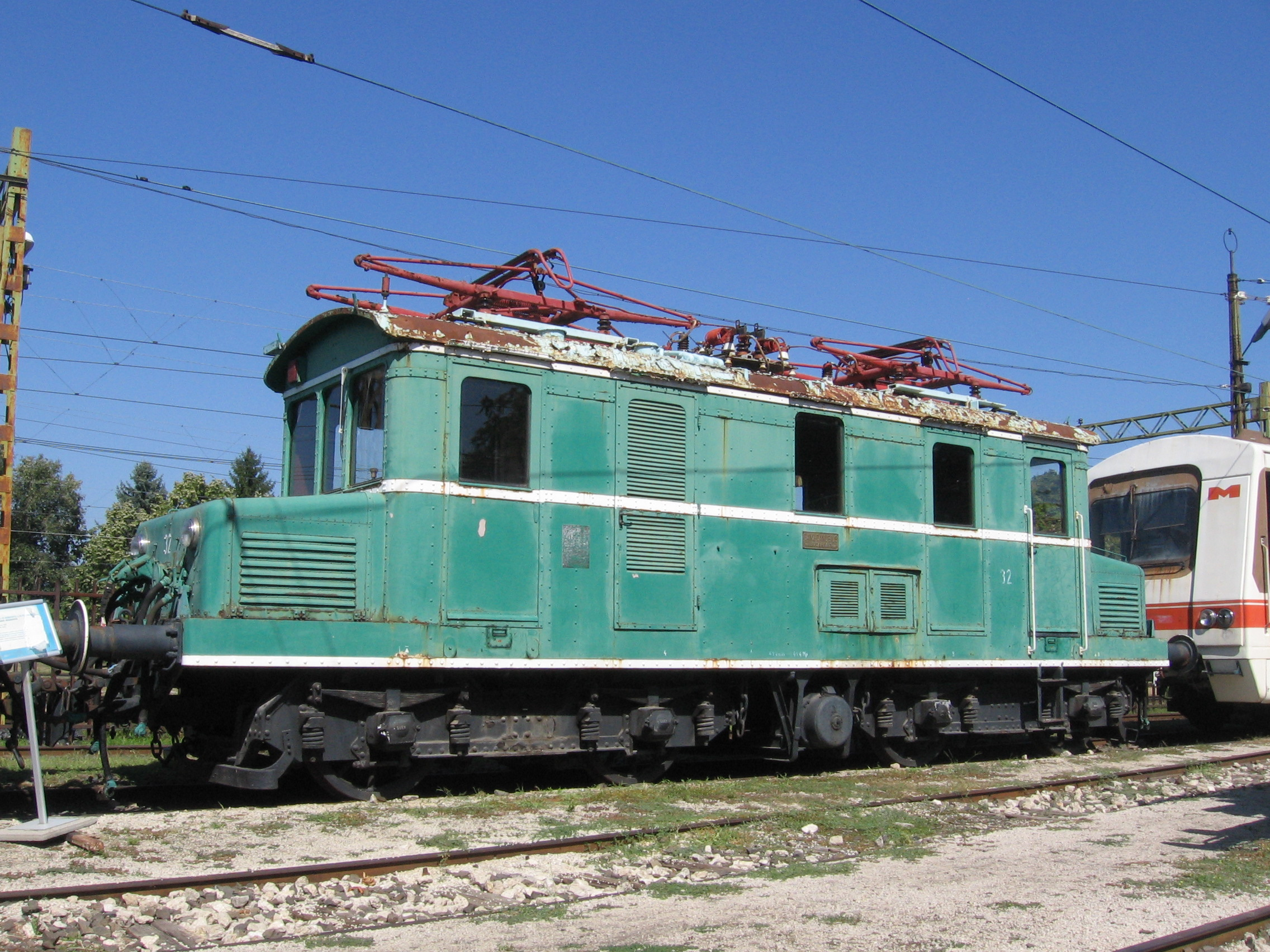

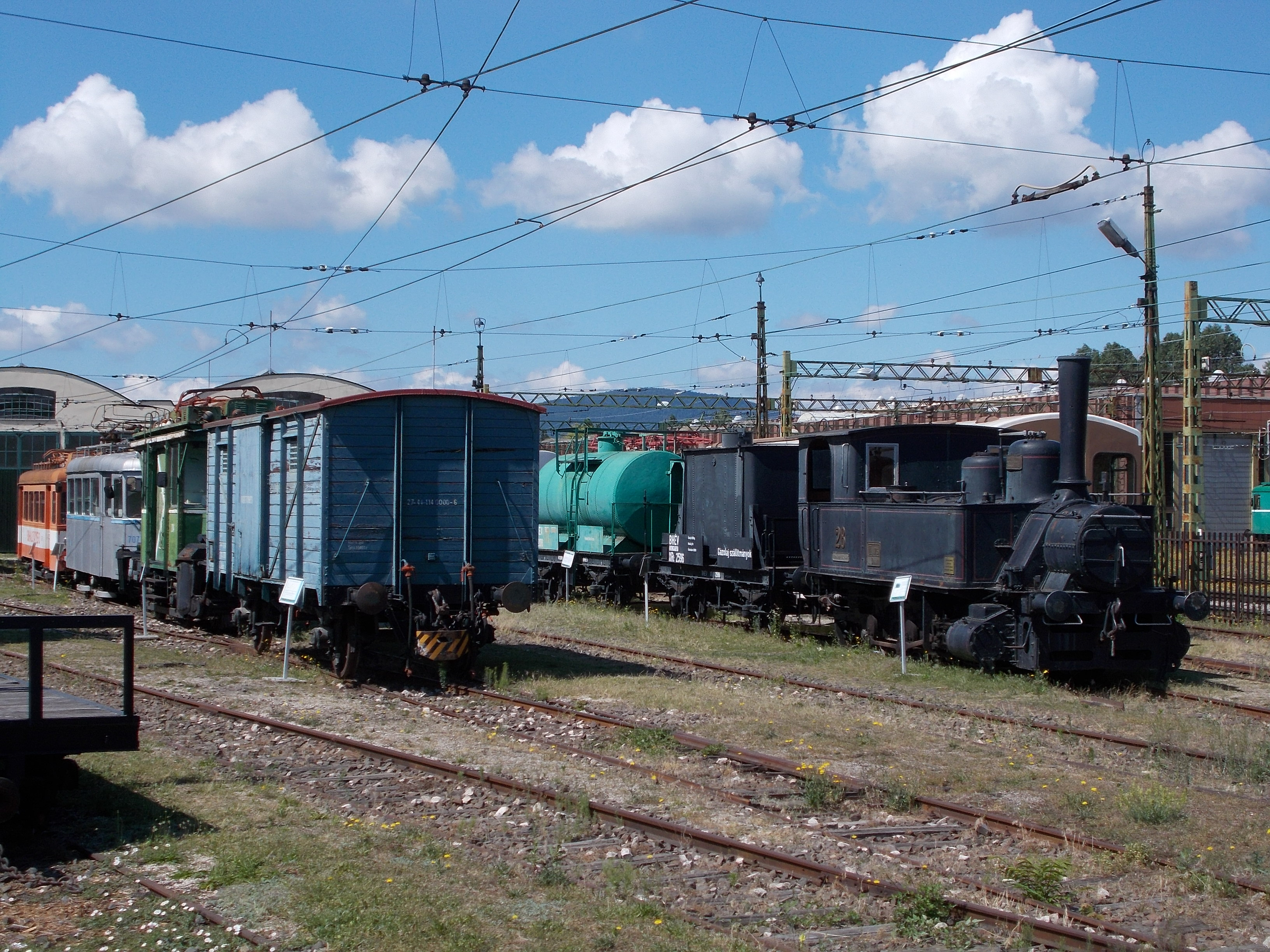

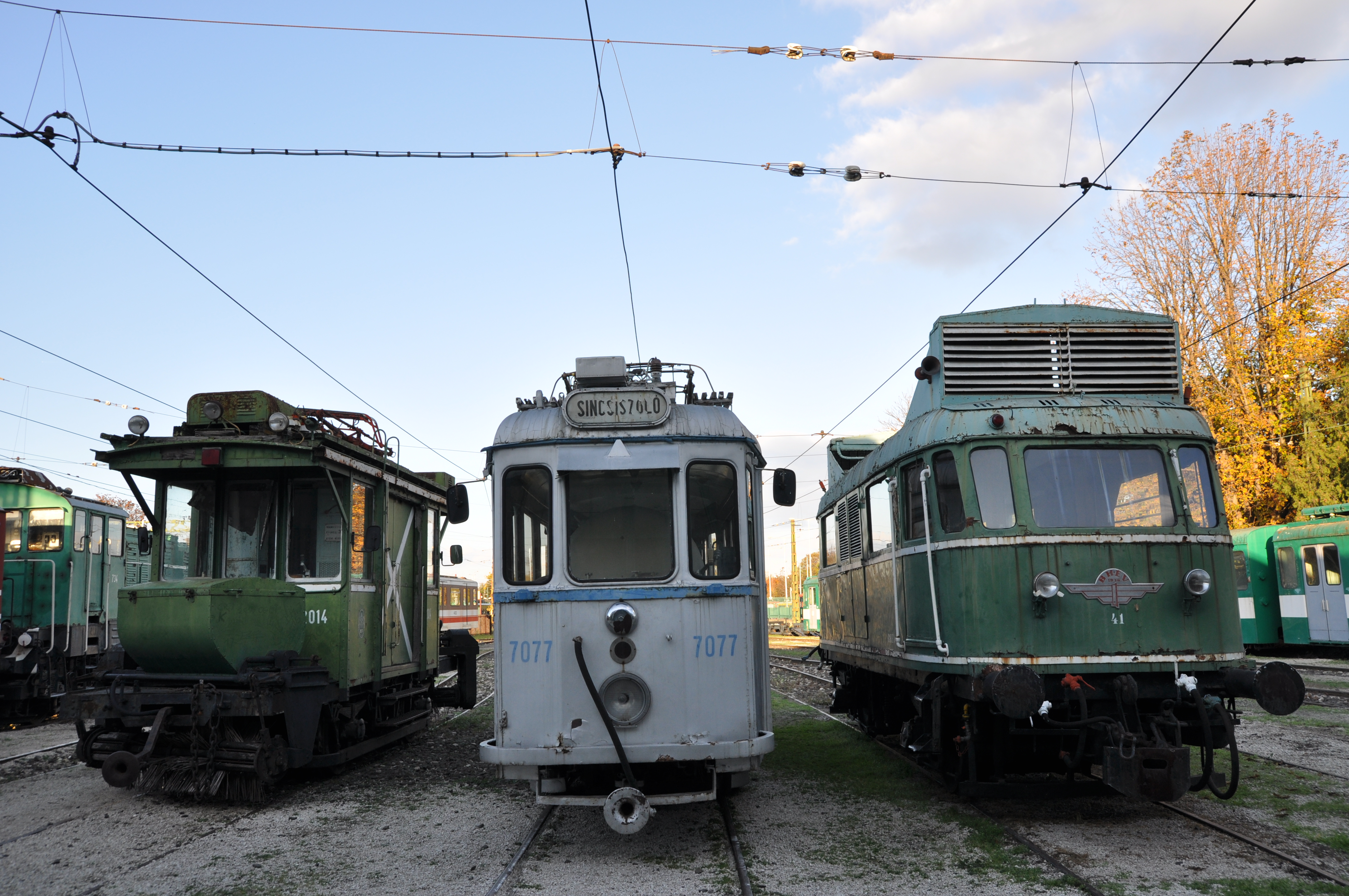

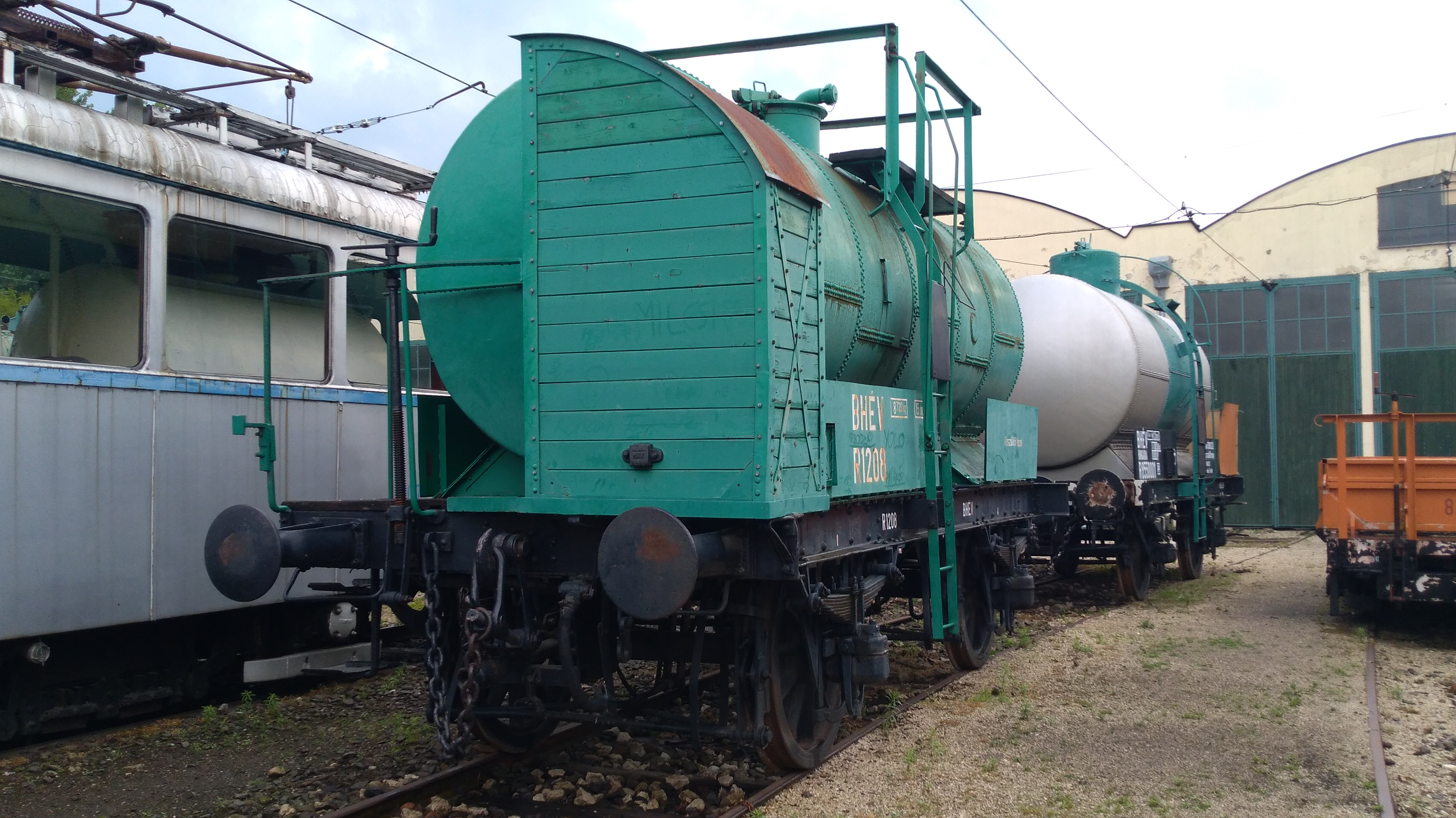

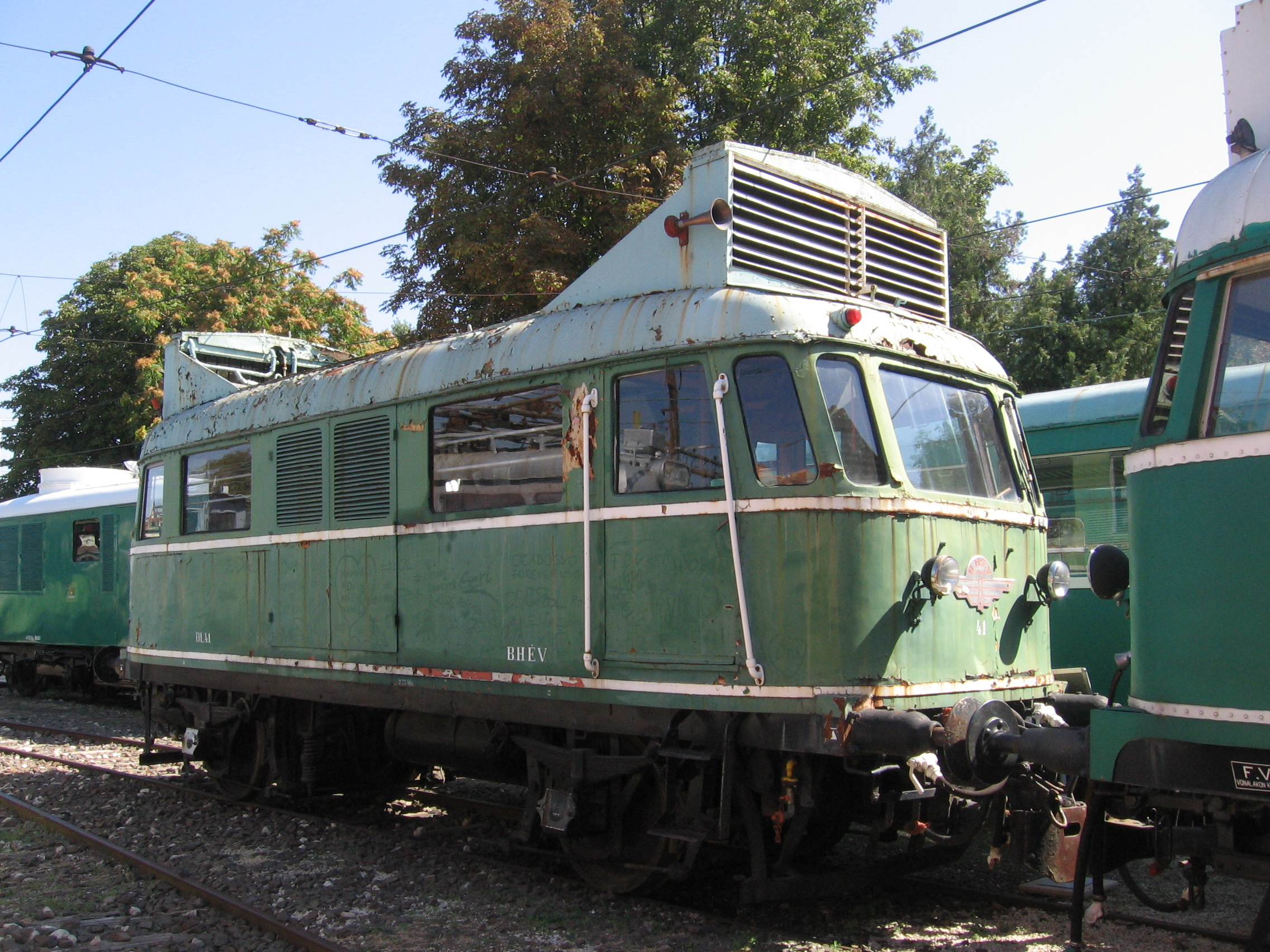

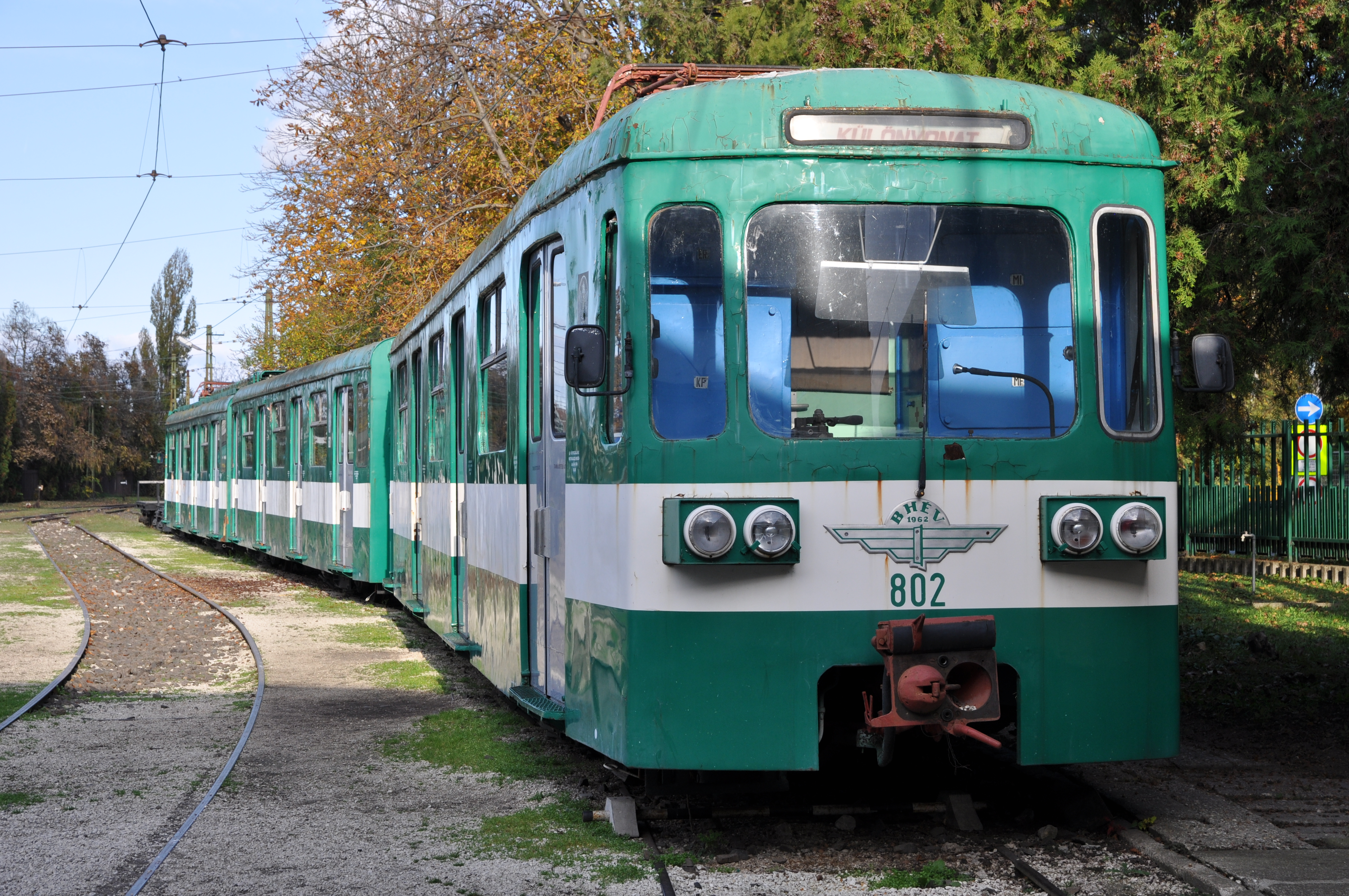

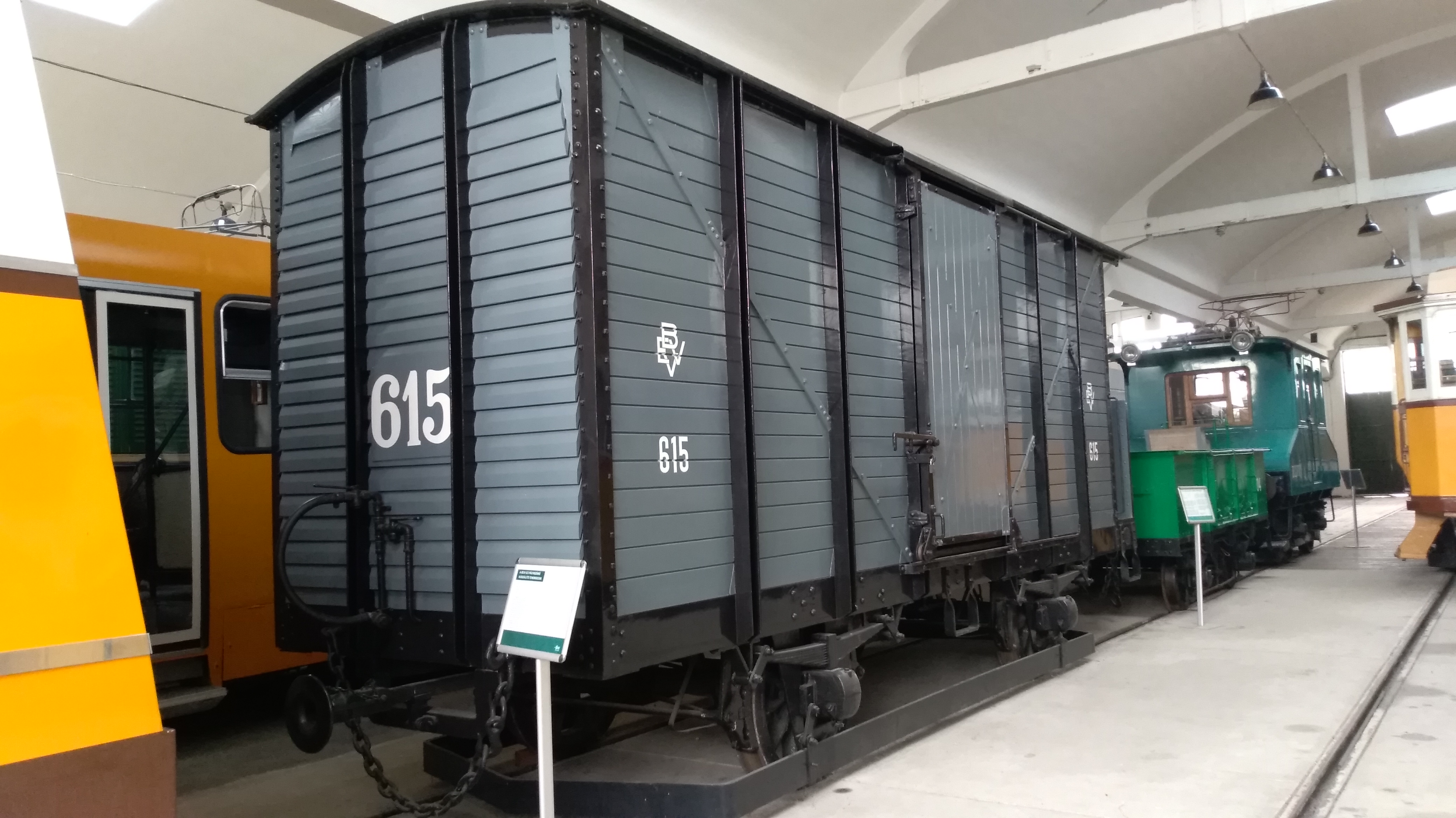

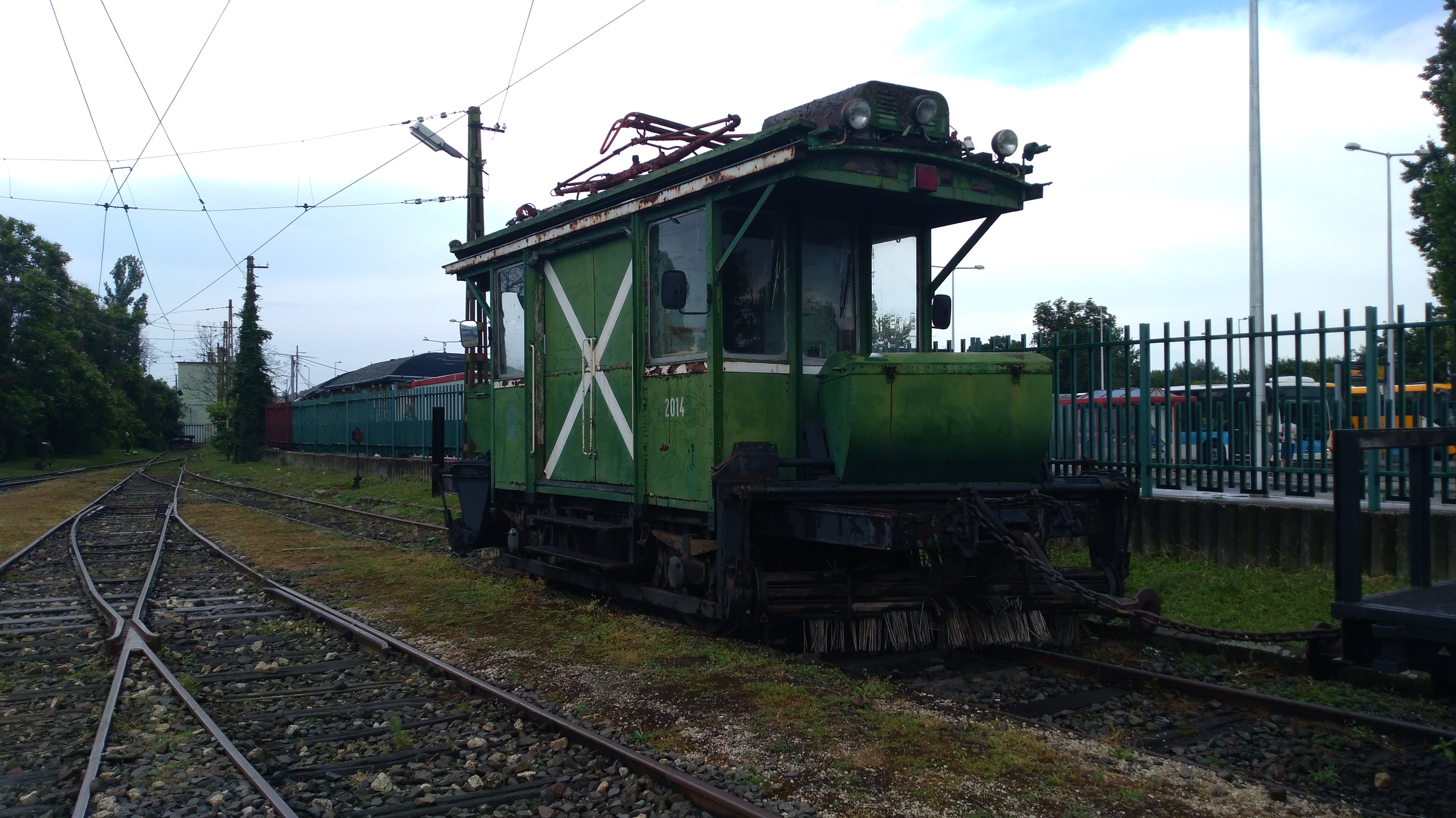

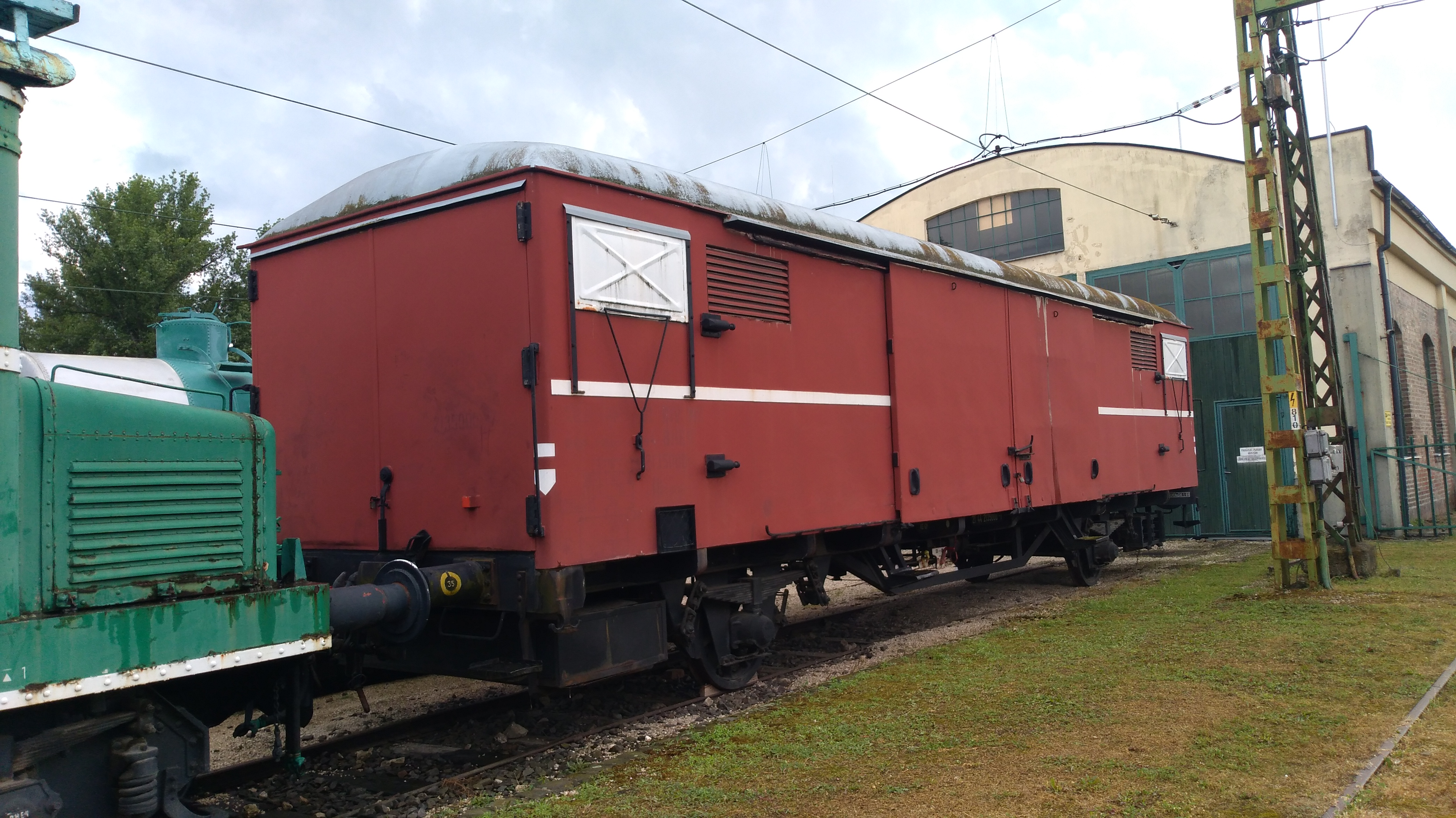

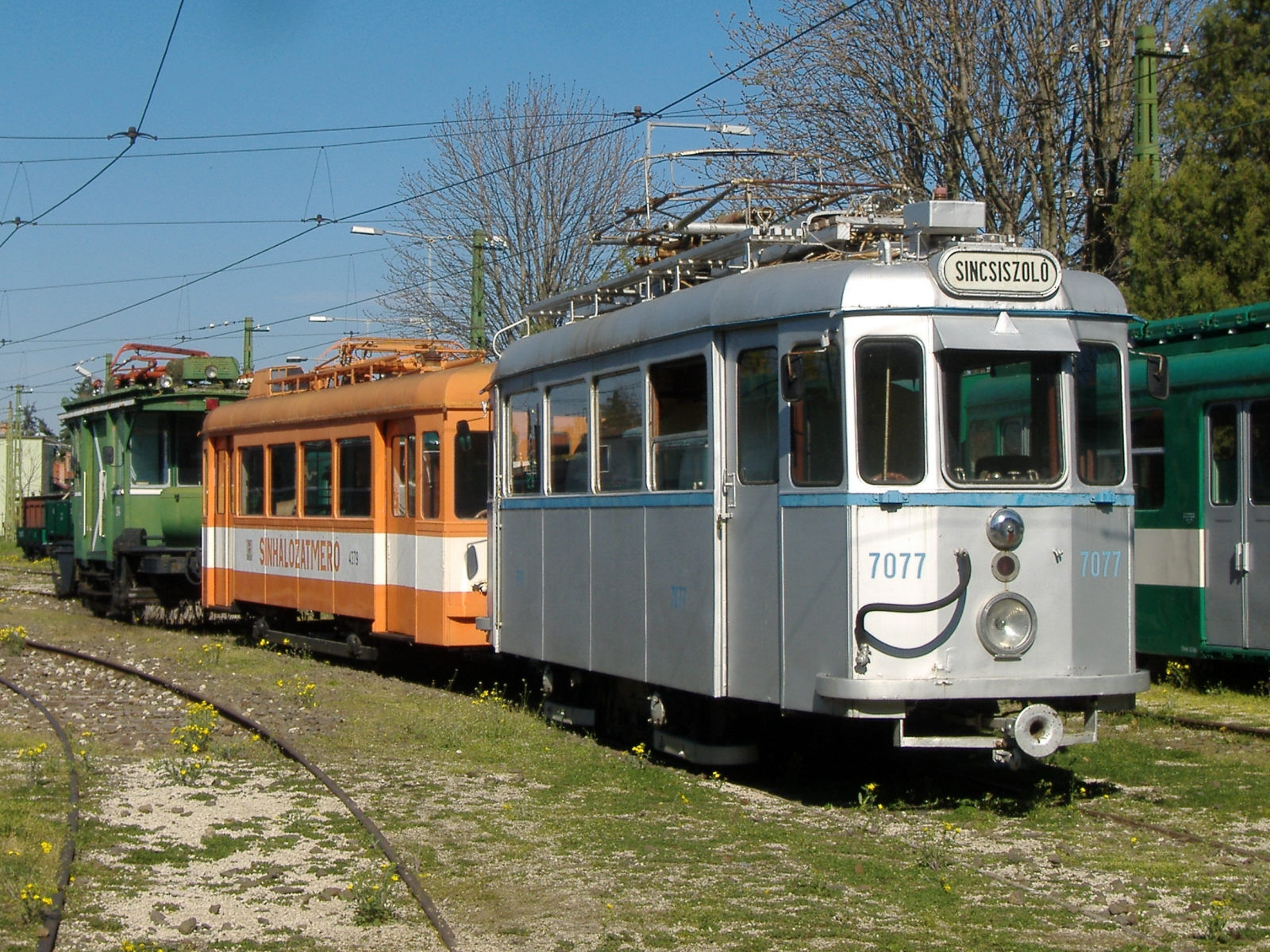

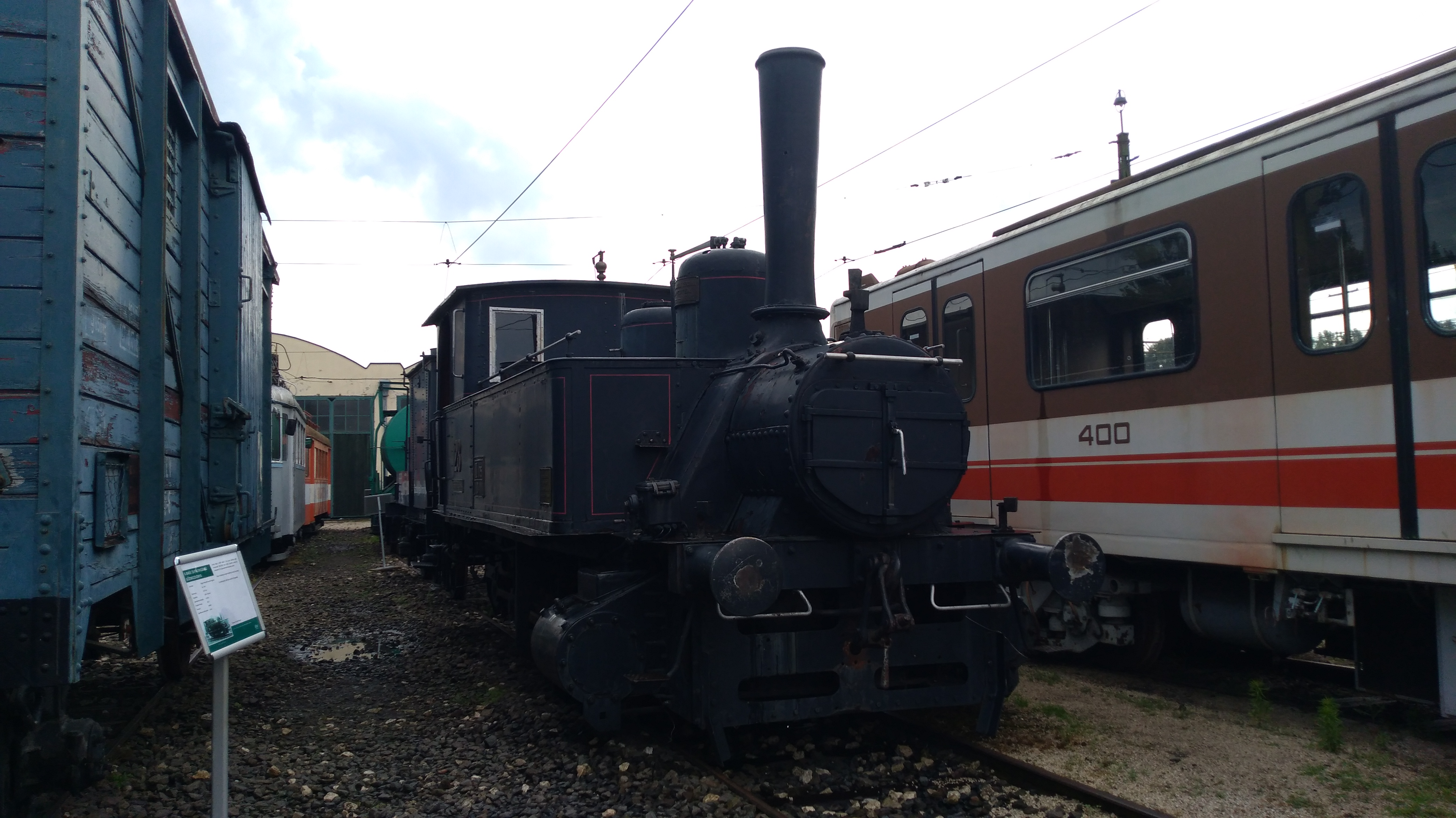

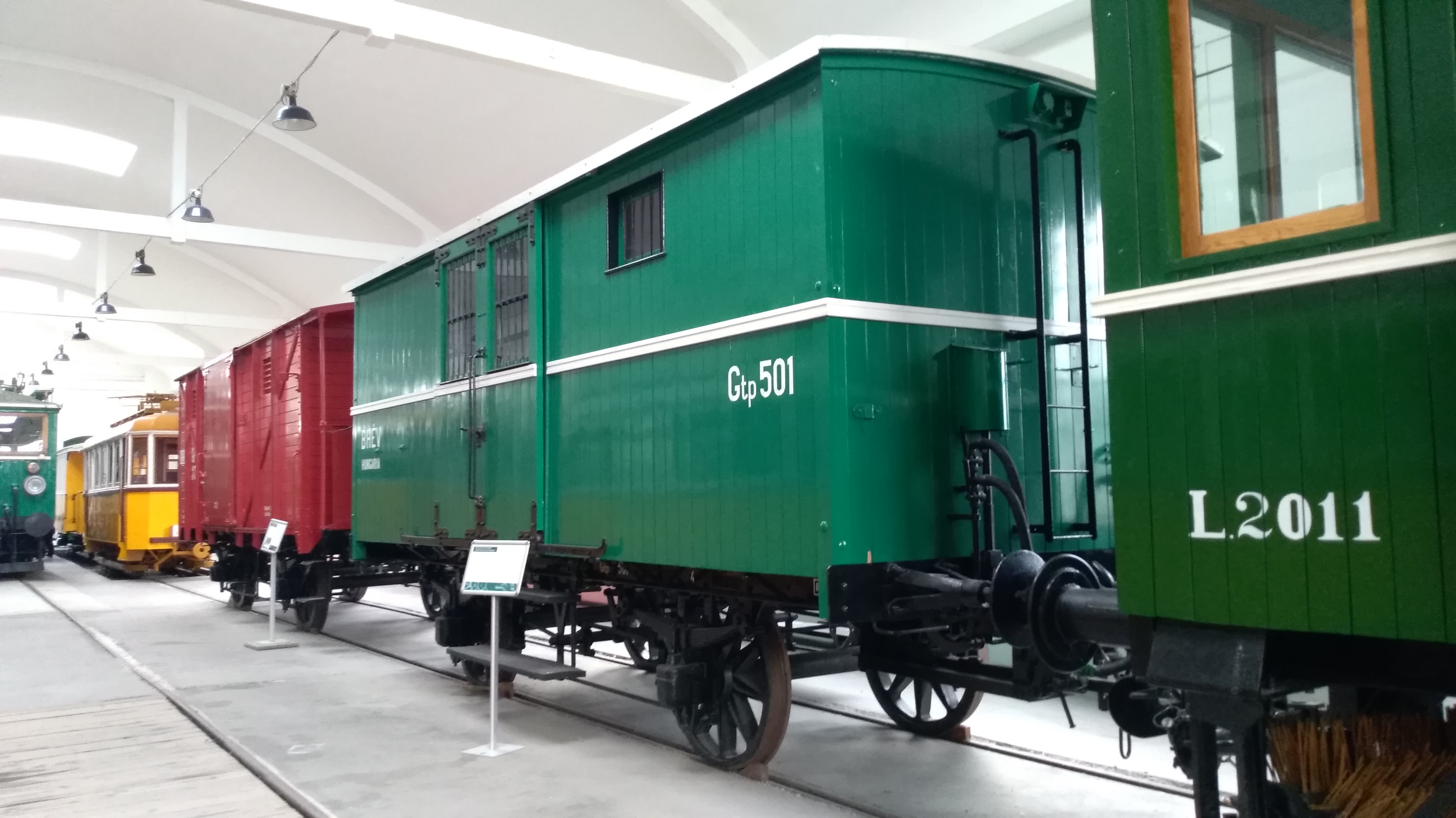

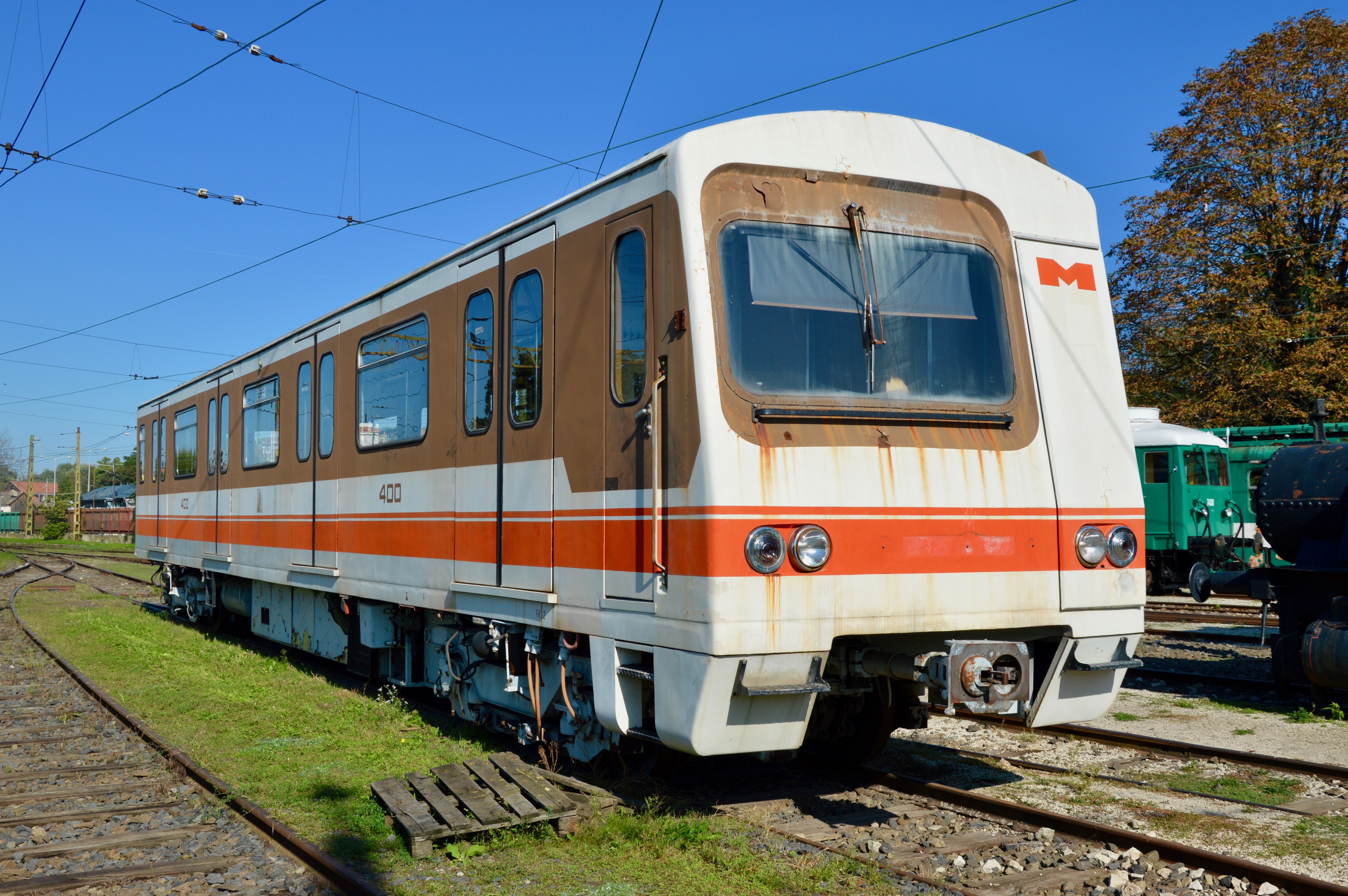

== Stored vehicles ==
It is interesting that a large number of old tram cars are set aside on the HÉV tracks, in places inaccessible to visitors, waiting to be renovated. Some pictures of these:

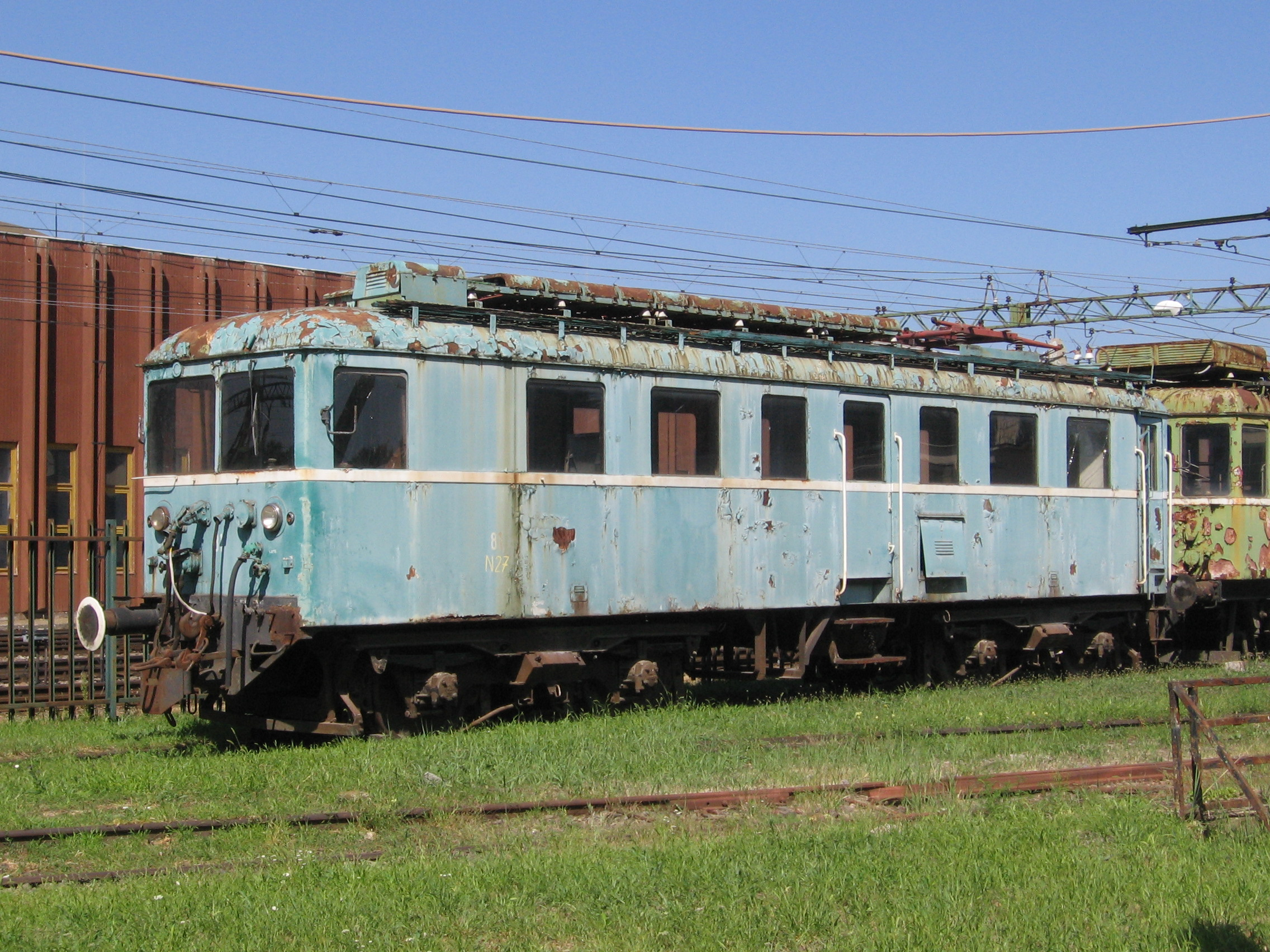

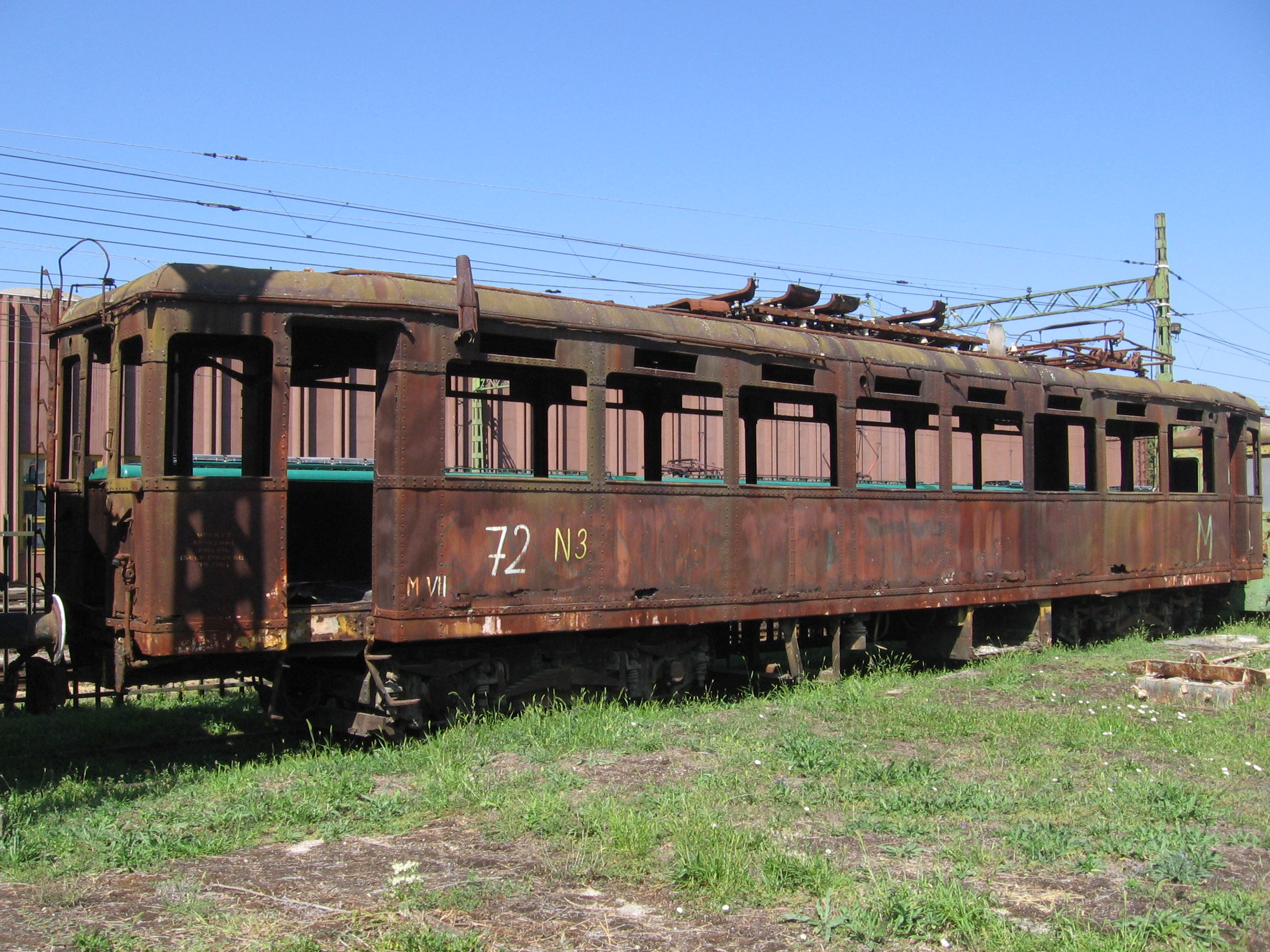

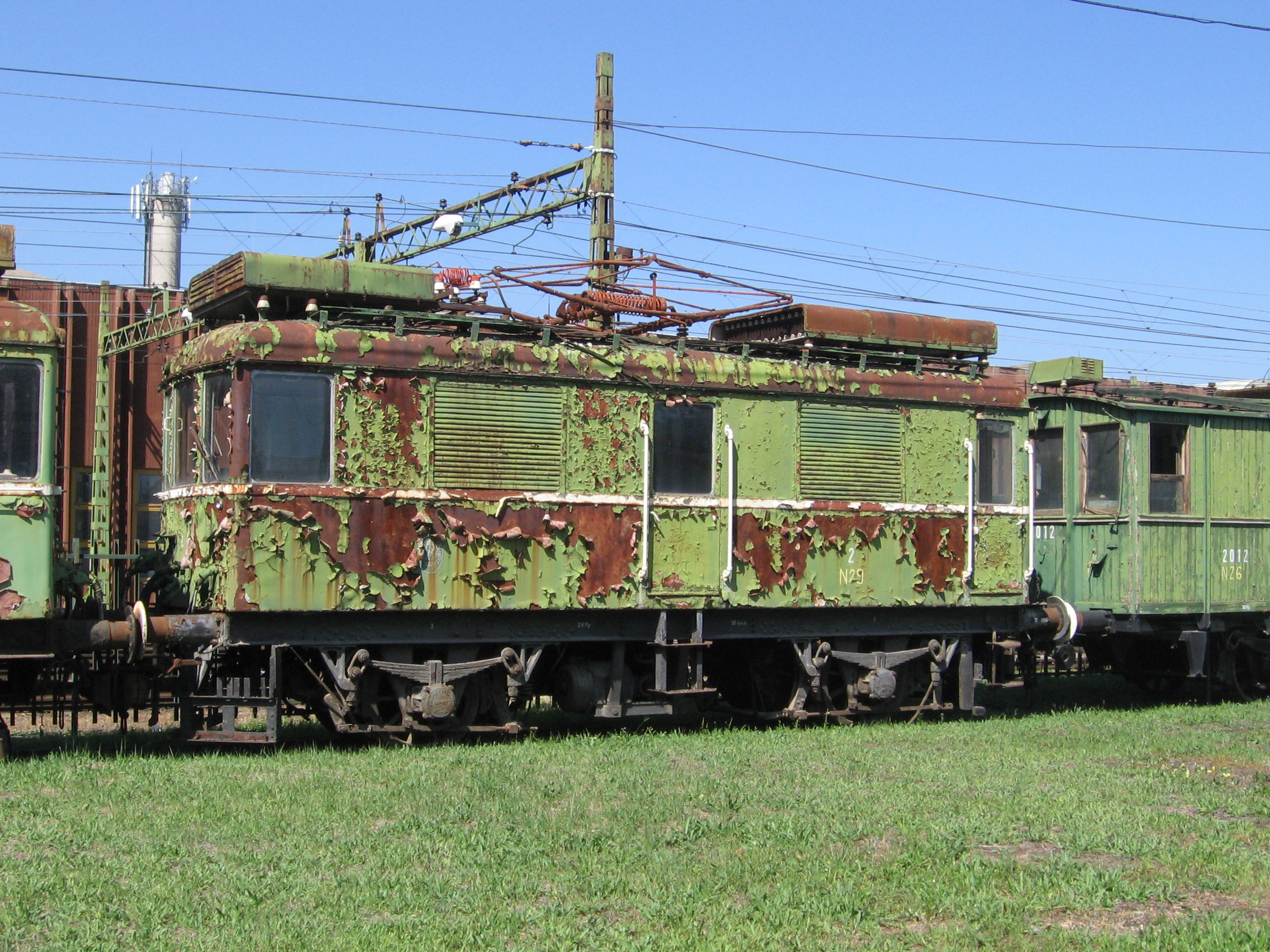

== Literature ==
- Szeldmajer László: Városi Tömegközlekedési Múzeum, Budapesti Közlekedési Zártkörűen Működő Részvénytársaság, Budapest, 2006
- Lovász István – Várnagy Zoltán: A szentendrei régi kocsiszín területén létesítendő helyi közforgalmú vasuti és városi tömegközlekedési üzemtörténeti gyűjtemény, BKV Emlékbizottság, h. n., 1991
