= MÁV Class V40 =

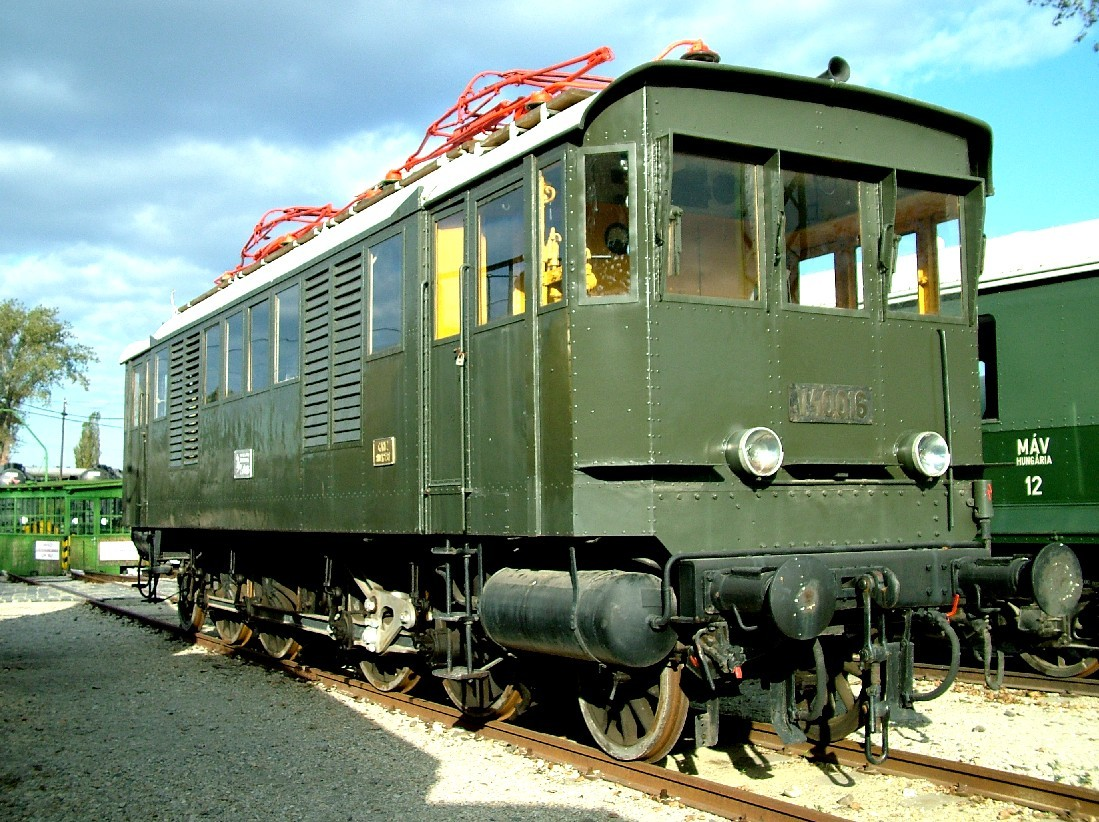
- V40.016 preserved at the Hungarian Railway History Park, Budapest
Type and origin
- Power type: Electric locomotive
- Builder: Ganz Works
- Build date: 1932-1937
- Total produced: 29
Specifications
- Configuration
  - Whyte: 2-8-2OE
  - UIC: 1′D1′
- Gauge: 1,435 mm (4 ft 8 1/2 in)
- Length: 13.83 metres
- Loco weight: 94 tonnes
- Traction motors: 1
Performance figures
- Maximum speed: 100 km/h
- Power output: 1,620 kW (2,170 hp)
- Tractive effort
  - Starting: 200 kN (45,000 lb_{f})

The MÁV Class V40 was an electric locomotive of the Hungarian State Railways (MÁV) and the first production electric locomotive using the Kandó system. It had a wheel arrangement of 1'D1' or 2-8-2 and a single Metropolitan-Vickers traction motor driving through side rods.

== Overview ==
Power for the electrification of railway traffic in Hungary could be extracted most economically from the nationwide 50 Hz electricity grid. Therefore, Kálmán Kandó developed his eponymous drive system, which is based on single-phase AC overhead lines and three-phase traction motors. The conversion of the current for the traction motor is provided by a rotary phase converter. The system was demonstrated on a test locomotive from 1923 and, from 1932 to 1935, the route from Budapest to Hegyeshalom was electrified at 16 kV, 50 Hz. The first electric locomotives on the line were of the MÁV V40 class. They were mixed-traffic locomotives with a top speed of 100 km/h. A total of 29 locomotives of this class were used on the said route. In the 1960s, the traction current system in Hungary was converted to 25 kV, 50 Hz and the Kandó locomotives were withdrawn.

== Preservation ==
V40.016 is preserved in the Hungarian Railway History Park, Budapest, after standing for years at Budapest East Railway Station.

== Technical features ==
The single-phase alternating current taken from the overhead line was converted into three-phase current by the phase converter and supplied to a single Metropolitan-Vickers traction motor which was a 48-pole asynchronous motor. The phase converter provided four fixed speeds (25,50,75 and 100 km/h) and intermediate speeds were obtained using a liquid rheostat.

Final drive was through a Kandó triangle with one arm connected to an auxiliary idling shaft to minimise unwanted vertical forces. The locomotive was built on a rigid frame. Two of the driving axles had side play, which was controlled by Krauss-Helmholtz bogies.

== Other Kandó locomotives ==
The experimental Kandó locomotive was MÁV Class V50, built 1923.MÁV-Baureihe_V50 Its wheel arrangement was E or 0-10-0. A freight version of the Class V40 was also built. This was the Class V60, built 1932,MÁV-Baureihe_V60 which had a wheel arrangement of F or 0-12-0.
