= List of steam locomotives remaining in Hungary =

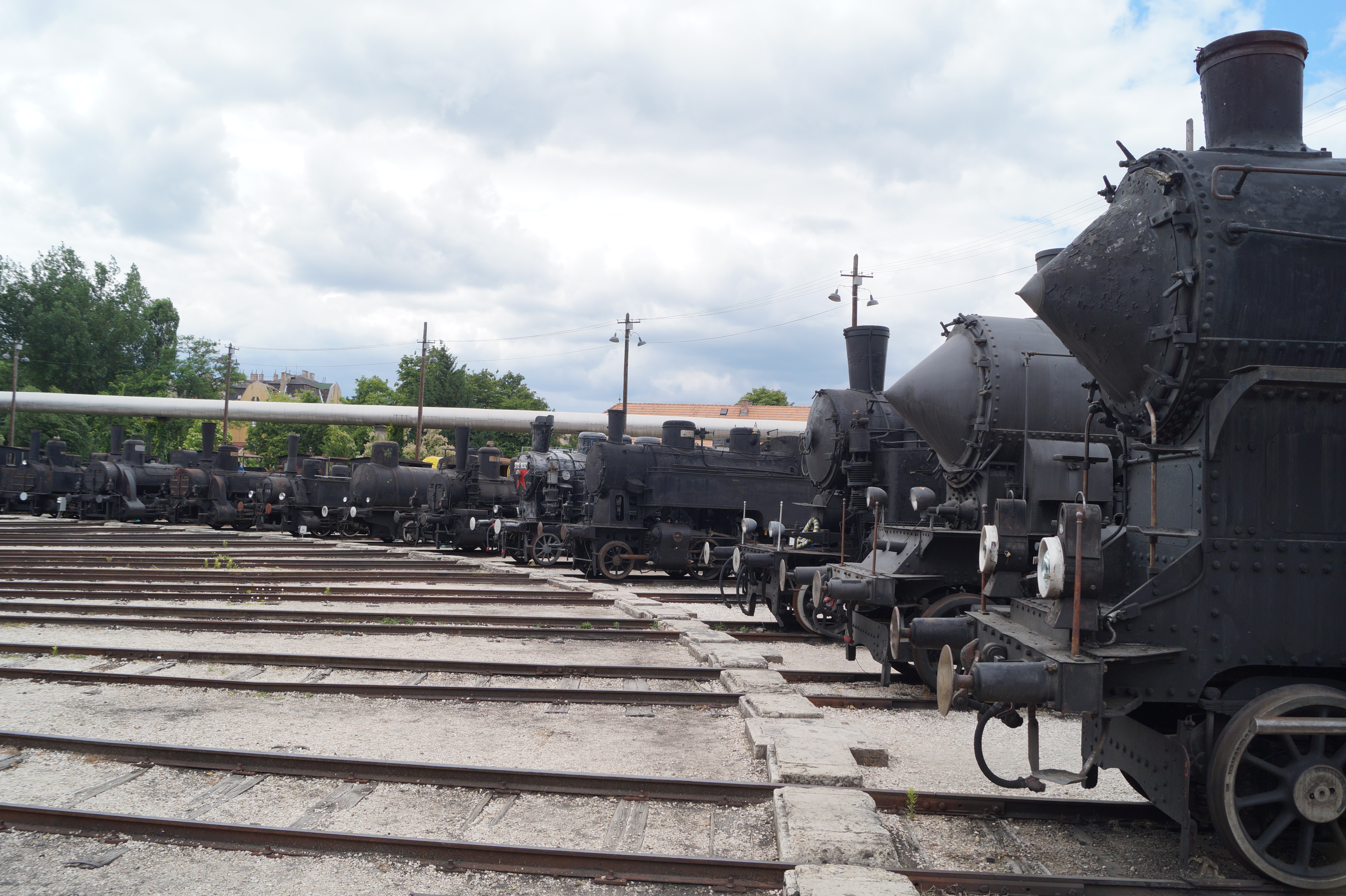
In the area of the Hungarian Railway History Park, there are several rescued old steam locomotives on display, in which interested visitors can even climb.

This page contains a list of the remaining steam locomotives in Hungary.

== History ==
Steam locomotives have been used in Hungary since the 1840s. Many types of early specimens have not survived. In the 20th century, more attention was paid to conscious preservation, and 1-1 specimens were exhibited in some museums or railway stations. Nevertheless, it was not until 2000 that the Hungarian Railway History Park opened in Budapest, which specifically allowed the presentation of locomotives (including many steam locomotives).

Although not all types of diesel and electric locomotives (no longer in use today) have been preserved, most of them are visible specimens. This is not the case for steam locomotives used in Hungary.

Of all the (approximately) 140 types, according to József Soltész, a train expert at the Museum of Transport (2009), "ten thousand steam locomotives have been in operation in the country, of which one hundred and fifty have survived." Of these, only 25 are operational. As the central database is not known about the locomotives found in Hungary, this list is of course not complete.

== Standard Gauge Locomotives ==
=== Railway Main Workshop in Istvántelek ===
Picture	Serial number	Place	Year of manufacture	Year of scrapping	Manufacturer	Comment
	no data available	Railway Main Workshop in Istvántelek, Budapest	no data available	no data available	no data available	
	no data available	Railway Main Workshop in Istvántelek, Budapest	no data available	no data available	no data available	
	no data available	Railway Main Workshop in Istvántelek, Budapest	no data available	no data available	no data available	
	301.006	Railway Main Workshop in Istvántelek, Budapest	c. 1911–1914	c. 1966–1968	MÁVAG	
	324.1527	Railway Main Workshop in Istvántelek, Budapest	c. 1909–1943	c. 1938–1981	MÁVAG	
	326.267	Railway Main Workshop in Istvántelek, Budapest	c. 1882–1912	c. 1960–1979	MÁVAG	
	326.160 or 326.460	Railway Main Workshop in Istvántelek, Budapest	c. 1882–1912	c. 1960–1979	MÁVAG	
	424.284	Railway Main Workshop in Istvántelek, Budapest	c. 1930s/1950s	c. 1980s	MÁVAG	
	424.053 (?)	Railway Main Workshop in Istvántelek, Budapest	c. 1930s/1950s	c. 1980s	MÁVAG	
	424	Railway Main Workshop in Istvántelek, Budapest	c. 1930s/1950s	c. 1980s	MÁVAG	

=== Hungarian Railway History Park ===
Picture	Serial number	Place	Year of manufacture	Year of scrapping	Manufacturer	Comment
	no data available	Hungarian Railway History Park, Budapest	no data available	no data available	no data available	
	91	Hungarian Railway History Park, Budapest	1915	1997	Krauss-Linz	
	301	Hungarian Railway History Park, Budapest	c. 1911–1914	c. 1966–1968	MÁVAG	
	303.002	Hungarian Railway History Park, Budapest	1951	1962	MÁVAG	
	328	Hungarian Railway History Park, Budapest	c. 1919–1922	c. 1964–1972	MÁVAG	
	341	Hungarian Railway History Park, Budapest	c. 1882–1883	c. 1950s	Wöhlert, Berlin	
	370	Hungarian Railway History Park, Budapest	c. 1898–1907	c. 1950s	MÁVAG	
	375.1032	Hungarian Railway History Park, Budapest	c. 1907–1959	c. 1990s	MÁVAG	
	376	Hungarian Railway History Park, Budapest	c. 1910–1923	c. 1940s–1970s	MÁVAG	
	377.433	Hungarian Railway History Park, Budapest	c. 1885–1924	c. 1930s–1950s	MÁVAG	
	377	Hungarian Railway History Park, Budapest	c. 1885–1924	c. 1930s–1950s	MÁVAG	
	411.118	Hungarian Railway History Park, Budapest	c. 1942–1945	c. 1950s–1980s	several different companies	
	424.365	Hungarian Railway History Park, Budapest	c. 1930s/1950s	c. 1980s	MÁVAG	
	442	Hungarian Railway History Park, Budapest	c. 1917–1920	1972	MÁVAG	
	476	Hungarian Railway History Park, Budapest	c. 1885–1912	before 1960s	Lokomotivfabrik der StEG	
	480	Hungarian Railway History Park, Budapest	no data available	no data available	no data available	
	520.034	Hungarian Railway History Park, Budapest	c. 1942–1950	c. 1962–1988	no data available	

=== Elsewhere ===
==== 242 ====
Picture	Serial number	Place	Year of manufacture	Year of scrapping	Manufacturer	Comment
	242.001	Északi Járműjavító, Budapest	c. 1936–1939	1961	MÁVAG	

==== 275 ====
Picture	Serial number	Place	Year of manufacture	Year of scrapping	Manufacturer	Comment
	275.064	Nyíregyháza-Sóstó	c. 1928–1940	1980s	MÁVAG	
	275.118	Cegléd	c. 1928–1940	1980s (?)	MÁVAG	
	275.120	Tiszafüred	c. 1928–1940	1980s (?)	MÁVAG	
	275.015 (?)	Zalaegerszeg	c. 1928–1940	1980s (?)	MÁVAG	

==== 324 ====
Picture	Serial number	Place	Year of manufacture	Year of scrapping	Manufacturer	Comment
	324	Sopron	c. 1909–1943	c. 1938–1981	MÁVAG	

==== 326 ====
Picture	Serial number	Place	Year of manufacture	Year of scrapping	Manufacturer	Comment
	326.136	Debrecen	c. 1882–1912	c. 1960–1979	MÁVAG	
	326.274	Békéscsaba	c. 1882–1912	c. 1960–1979	MÁVAG	
	326.321	Budapest	c. 1882–1912	c. 1960–1979	MÁVAG	

==== 332 ====
Picture	Serial number	Place	Year of manufacture	Year of scrapping	Manufacturer	Comment
	332	Budapest	c. 1860–1872	before 1950s	Lokomotivfabrik der StEG	Owned by the Museum of Transportation. It is currently not on display due to the relocation of the Museum.

==== 375 ====
Picture	Serial number	Place	Year of manufacture	Year of scrapping	Manufacturer	Comment
	375	Baja	c. 1907–1959	c. 1990s	MÁVAG	
	375	Balatonszemes	c. 1907–1959	c. 1990s	MÁVAG	
	375	Pécs	c. 1907–1959	c. 1990s	MÁVAG	
	375.008	Csopak	c. 1907–1959	c. 1990s	MÁVAG	
	375	Budakeszi	c. 1907–1959	c. 1990s	MÁVAG	
	375.1503	Záhony	c. 1907–1959	c. 1990s	MÁVAG	
	375.583	Kiskunhalas	c. 1907–1959	c. 1990s	MÁVAG	
	375.680	Balatonalmádi	c. 1907–1959	c. 1990s	MÁVAG	
	375.694	Nyíregyháza	c. 1907–1959	c. 1990s	MÁVAG	
	375.1025	Békéscsaba	c. 1907–1959	c. 1990s	MÁVAG	
	375.642	Kőszeg	c. 1907–1959	c. 1990s	MÁVAG	
	375.896	Nagykanizsa	c. 1907–1959	c. 1990s	MÁVAG	
	375.680	Veszprém	c. 1907–1959	c. 1990s	MÁVAG	
	375.1031	Veszprém	c. 1907–1959	c. 1990s	MÁVAG	
	375 657	Mezőhegyes	c. 1907–1959	c. 1990s	MÁVAG	
	375	Pusztaszabolcs	c. 1907–1959	c. 1990s	MÁVAG	
	375	Vác	c. 1907–1959	c. 1990s	MÁVAG	

==== 376 ====
Picture	Serial number	Place	Year of manufacture	Year of scrapping	Manufacturer	Comment
	376.450	LOKOMOTÍV irodaház, Budapest	c. 1910–1923	c. 1940s–1970s	MÁVAG	
	376.649	Siófok	c. 1910–1923	c. 1940s–1970s	MÁVAG	
	376.642	Kaposvár	c. 1910–1923	c. 1940s–1970s	MÁVAG	
	376.631	Ajka	c. 1910–1923	c. 1940s–1970s	MÁVAG	
	376.513	Mátészalka	c. 1910–1923	c. 1940s–1970s	MÁVAG	
	376.531	Mezőkövesd	c. 1910–1923	c. 1940s–1970s	MÁVAG	

==== 377 ====
Picture	Serial number	Place	Year of manufacture	Year of scrapping	Manufacturer	Comment
	377.503	Zalaegerszeg	c. 1885–1924	c. 1930s–1950s	MÁVAG	
	377.210	Salgótarján	c. 1885–1924	c. 1930s–1950s	MÁVAG	
	377	Bélaapátfalva	c. 1885–1924	c. 1930s–1950s	MÁVAG	
	377.092	Balassagyarmat	c. 1885–1924	c. 1930s–1950s	MÁVAG	

==== 381 ====
Picture	Serial number	Place	Year of manufacture	Year of scrapping	Manufacturer	Comment
	381.001	Gyál	1884	1968	Krauss, München	From 1968 this locomotive was exhibited in front of the Transport Museum (number 6633), from 2015 it is located at the upper stop of Gyál.

==== 411 ====
Picture	Serial number	Place	Year of manufacture	Year of scrapping	Manufacturer	Comment
	411.358	Hegyeshalom	c. 1942–1945	before 1980s	several different companies	

==== 424 ====
Picture	Serial number	Place	Year of manufacture	Year of scrapping	Manufacturer	Comment
	424.001	Budapest	c. 1930s/1950s	c. 1980s	MÁVAG	Owned by the Museum of Transportation. It is currently not on display due to the relocation of the Museum.
	424.124	Dombóvár	c. 1930s/1950s	c. 1980s	MÁVAG	
	424.320	Szolnok	c. 1930s/1950s	c. 1980s	MÁVAG	
	424.309	Nagykanizsa	c. 1930s/1950s	c. 1980s	MÁVAG	

==== 485 ====
Picture	Serial number	Place	Year of manufacture	Year of scrapping	Manufacturer	Comment
	485	Mosonmagyaróvár	c. 1920s	c. 1970s	MÁVAG	

==== 4 BHÉV ====
Picture	Serial number	Place	Year of manufacture	Year of scrapping	Manufacturer	Comment
	4 BHÉV	Railway Main Workshop in Istvántelek, Budapest	1887	no data available	StEG Vienna	

=== Unknown types ===
Picture	Serial number	Place	Year of manufacture	Year of scrapping	Manufacturer	Comment
	no data available	Budapest	no data available	no data available	before 1980s	It was used in the Budapest Gas Factory.
	no data available	Ercsi	no data available	no data available	no data available	
	no data available	Urban Public Transport Museum, Szentendre	no data available	no data available	no data available	
	did not receive a serial number (name: Csingervölgy)	Ajka	1890	1978	Wiener Neustädter Lokomotivfabrik	
	no data available	Miskolc	no data available	no data available	no data available	

== Narrow Gauge Locomotives ==
Picture	Serial number	Place	Year of manufacture	Year of scrapping	Manufacturer	Comment
	OKÜ 10	Széchenyi Railway Museum	1870		Sigl 1060	
	Kaposvári Cukorgyár V	Széchenyi Railway Museum	1916		Krauss 7124	
	356.301	Széchenyi Railway Museum	no data available	no data available	no data available	
	357.314	Széchenyi Railway Museum	1923	no data available	O&K	
	no data available	Széchenyi Railway Museum	no data available	no data available	no data available	
	490.057	Széchenyi Railway Museum	no data available	no data available	no data available	
	495.5001	Széchenyi Railway Museum	no data available	no data available	no data available	
	492	Széchenyi Railway Museum	no data available	in use	no data available	
	490.053	Kecskemét	1942	2009	MÁVAG	
	394.057	Szilvásvárad	1940s	in use	no data available	
	490.2005	Gyöngyös	1954	in use	no data available	
	447.401	Miskolc	1954	1972	no data available	
	490.2002	Királyrét	no data available	in use	no data available	
	490.2001	Kaszó	1954	in use	NN, Resica	
	490.039	Budapest Children's Railway	1942	in use	no data available	
	490.056	Budapest Children's Railway	1950	in use	no data available	
	490.2003	Gemenc	1954	in use	NN, Resicabánya	
	394.023	Debrecen	1923	in use	MÁVAG	
	490.2002	Csömödér	1955	in use	Romania	
	8418	Lenti	1917	1960s	Orenstein & Koppel	
	490.041	Szombathely	1942	1970s	MÁVAG	
	no data available	Budapest	no data available	no data available	no data available	Owned by the Museum of Transportation. It is currently not on display due to the relocation of the Museum.

== Other articles ==
- List of Hungarian locomotives
