= Széchenyi Railway Museum =

Narrow-gauge railway line in Hungary

- Nagycenki Széchenyi Múzeumvasút
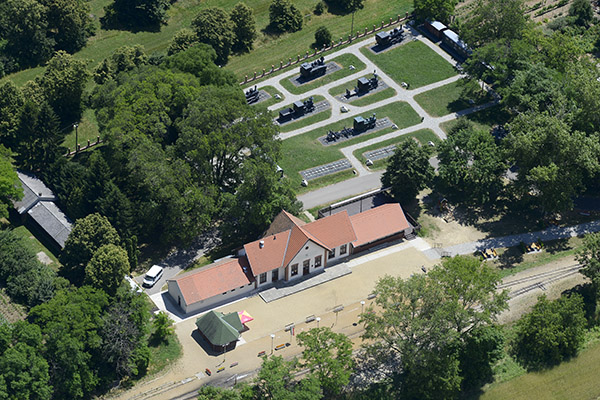
- Established: 1970
- Location: Nagycenk
- Coordinates: 47.624444°N 16.712222°E

The Széchenyi Railway Museum (Hungarian: Nagycenki Széchenyi Múzeumvasút) is a railway museum and narrow gauge railway in Nagycenk, Hungary.

== Railway ==
The museum is connected to the Győr–Sopron–Ebenfurth railway by a 760 mm narrow gauge railway.

== Exhibits ==
There are number of narrow gauge locomotives and other items of rolling stock on display outside at the museum.

=== Steam Locomotives ===
Railway	Number or name	Builder	Works Number	Built	Gauge	Notes	Image
	OKÜ 10	Sigl	1060	1870	1,000 mm (3 ft 3 3/8 in)		
	OKÜ 21	Krauss	4428	1900	1,000 mm (3 ft 3 3/8 in)		
Kaposvár Sugar Factory	V	Krauss	7124	1916			
Graf Wenckheim Mosonszentmiklos	357.314; Hanyi Istók	O&K	10726	1923			
	Kincses	MÁVAG	3787	1915			
	490,057	MÁVAG	5849	1950			
Diósgyőr	8	MÁVAG	3782	1915		Carries 495,5001, also numbered 411,005.	
	492				760 mm (2 ft 5 15/16 in)	Operational	
