= Railway Main Workshop in Istvántelek (Budapest) =

Building in Budapest, Hungary

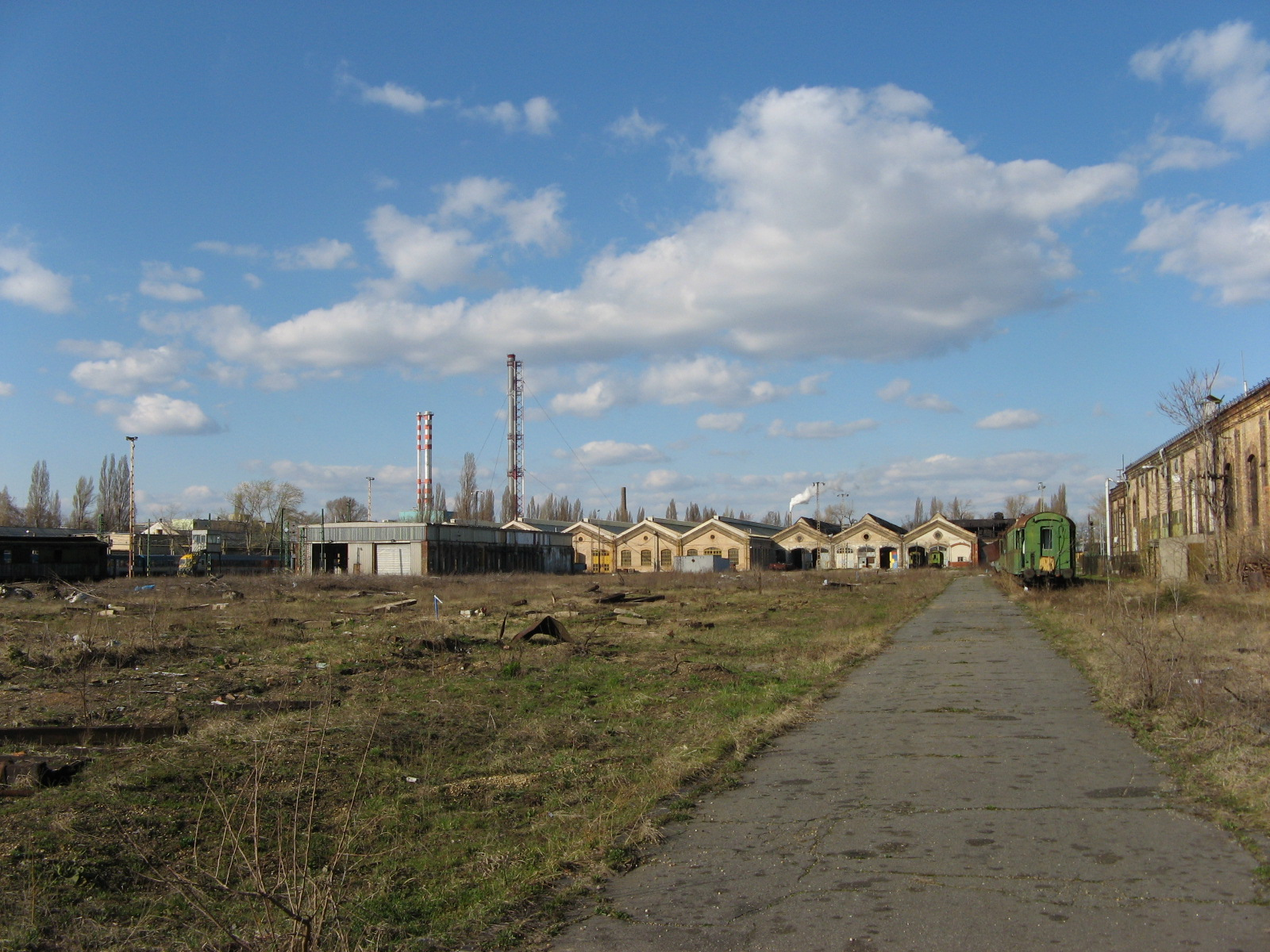
- The courtyard of the main workshop
- Interactive map of the Railway Main Workshop in Istvántelek (Budapest) area

General information
- Location: 1045 Budapest, Elem u. 5-7.
- Coordinates: 47.5488°N 19.1034°E
- Construction started: 1902
- Construction stopped: 1905
- Opened: 1905

Railway Main Workshop in Istvántelek was once one of the most important railway vehicle repair shops in Hungary. The main workshop in Istvántelek, Budapest IV. district (Újpest) is located in a part of the city district, occupying roughly half of the former. The former glory can only be imagined today, much of the halls have been demolished; what not, there the weeds proliferate. From the railway era, only the color of the motor car and the steam workshop remained. The Hungarian Railway History Park is located in the immediate vicinity of the area. Its steam locomotives are used to operate at this location.

== History ==
=== From opening to dualism ===
Today, it is a well-known fact from the history books that the Pest – Vác railway line was opened in 1846, and then the Pest – Szolnok route a year later, for which a maintenance station was built at the Nyugati railway station under the name Pesti Főműhely (Nyugati Főműhely) in 1847. With the rapid expansion of the railway, new, larger-capacity workshops would have been needed, so the site of the future main workshop was designated in Rákospalota, in the area owned by the National Hungarian Economic Association and for the most part by Count Sándor Károlyi. There was an area of adequate size here and it fell close to the Western Railway Station. This area was not unknown to the railway, as a square of 1430 was expropriated by MÁV as early as 1889 from the corner of the long plot at the Pest city border, so that a direct turn from Vác to Óbuda could be built. This arch was eroded during the construction of the main workshop, according to contemporary maps.

In the sandy, loose subsoil, work began in 1901 after a lengthy expropriation process, followed by construction in 1902. The general layout plan for the main workshop was designed by the mechanical engineering department of the board. To make it easier for the workers to travel, a railway stop was built next to the construction site called “Palota-Újfalu”.

In the first phase, the workers' dining room (Casino), the central office building, the gate next to the main building, and then a temporary bath were built, which were later retained in a similar role.

The construction of the track network and workshop halls began in 1902, during which the car mechanic and the lathe workshop were built in the first year. At that time, the car repair shop was the largest building in Budapest with its 24,000 m2.

In 1903, the locomotive workshop was handed over, and several warehouses were completed. The floor area of the locomotive assembly was 20,100 m², which contained 82 locomotive stations, as well as a 98 m long boiler forge workshop.

The lathe and locomotive workshop included a lathe workshop and a blacksmith's workshop, a wheel blacksmith's workshop, a spring workshop and a foundry. A small boiler house with two boilers and a 30 m high chimney was built to serve the use of steam.

On the eastern side of the area, a butler's workshop was established at 740 m², and two water towers were built there. Also located on the east side is a huge boiler and engine room with loading, coal and slag storage facilities. Here, the designers thought of the future, so both the machine and boiler houses were designed to expand over time. The boilers were supplied by the Nicholson plant, the steam engines by the Flame machine plant and the generators by Ganz.

The handover of the plant was scheduled for June 1, 1904, so there was a day when 500 workers worked at one time. Construction of the machine foundations began in April 1904, after which the relocation of the machines in good condition from the Western headquarters began and new ones were acquired.

The opening ceremony took place in style on May 1, 1905, when the first decorated train carrying 1,150 workers rolled through the main gate.

After the construction of the workshop began, the construction of the 120-apartment railway housing estate in the south-eastern part of Rákospalota, now known as the MÁV site, began in 1907, which was expanded in 1914 with 252 new apartments.

=== Classes of the main workshop ===
Courtyard of the main workshop (chimneys of the Újpest Power Plant in the background) Hall interior in good condition Ruined hall interior Exterior of the hall

- Class I - Chief Engineering
- II. class - number class
- III / a. class - lathe and machining
- III / b. class - locomotive parts machining
- ARC. class - locomotive assembly
- Class V - car class
- VI. class - plant power plant (small and large boiler house)

In June 1911, the Érsekújvár branch was placed under the control of the Istvántelk main workshop, where locomotives and lorries were mainly repaired.

From 1912, from the electrification of the Rákospalota-Veresegyház-Gödöllő railway line to 1936, electric motor cars were also repaired here. Of the passenger cars, the larger four-axle cars were mainly repaired in Istvántelk, as these previous workshops could only be highlighted with difficulty. As a new method, autogenous welding was introduced here, which triggered the difficult and slow operation of riveting.

=== During the First World War ===
With the First World War, its role increased, thanks to which the main workshop was supplied with a power plant, an oil gas plant and a new water supply system, and the electric workshop was renovated and expanded. At the outbreak of World War I, 80 workers and 11 officials were called up, but were later discharged from service. The number of workers reached 2,000 at this time, but by the 1920s it had dropped to around 1,600.

=== During World War II ===
Between the two wars, a concrete fence was built and a 2 km paved road was completed, and natural gas from Hajdúszoboszló was introduced into the area. During World War II, the area suffered more severe damage, the car class was damaged due to a bomb attack, and several smaller workshops were burned.

=== The Landleres era ===
After the war, it was renamed Jenő Landler's Vehicle Repair Plant, but its role decreased with the displacement of steam locomotives, people were sent during continuous downsizing, and many departments were closed. There was also an idea that Jenő Landler, Vehicle Repairer, would take over the role of the Northern workshop, but this was later discarded, so the Northern remained, this workshop was closed.

=== After the steam era ===
The steam plant in Hungary came to an end in 1984, so the role of Istvántelek as the main workshop ceased permanently. Of course, not everything has disappeared from here, today the workshop of MÁV Nosztalgia Kft. [1] maintenance halls for multiple units. In addition, a lot of small companies rent premises and halls in the former workshop and warehouse buildings.

=== Water towers of the main workshop ===
There are two very beautiful Intze water towers on the site of the industrial site, each with a 120 m³ reservoir that once provided the plant with a water supply. Renovating them remained a plan for a long time; there was also talk of creating flats in it. The water towers were finally renovated between 2010-2012.

- The south water tower
- The northern water tower

== Curiosity ==
In the area of the Main Workshop there are many railway and steam locomotives and steam locomotives in poor condition. These are stored partly in disused halls and partly outdoors. In contrast to the collection of the neighboring railway park, they are inaccessible, there is no financial support for their maintenance, and their fate is uncertain.

== Gallery ==
=== The refurbished part in use ===
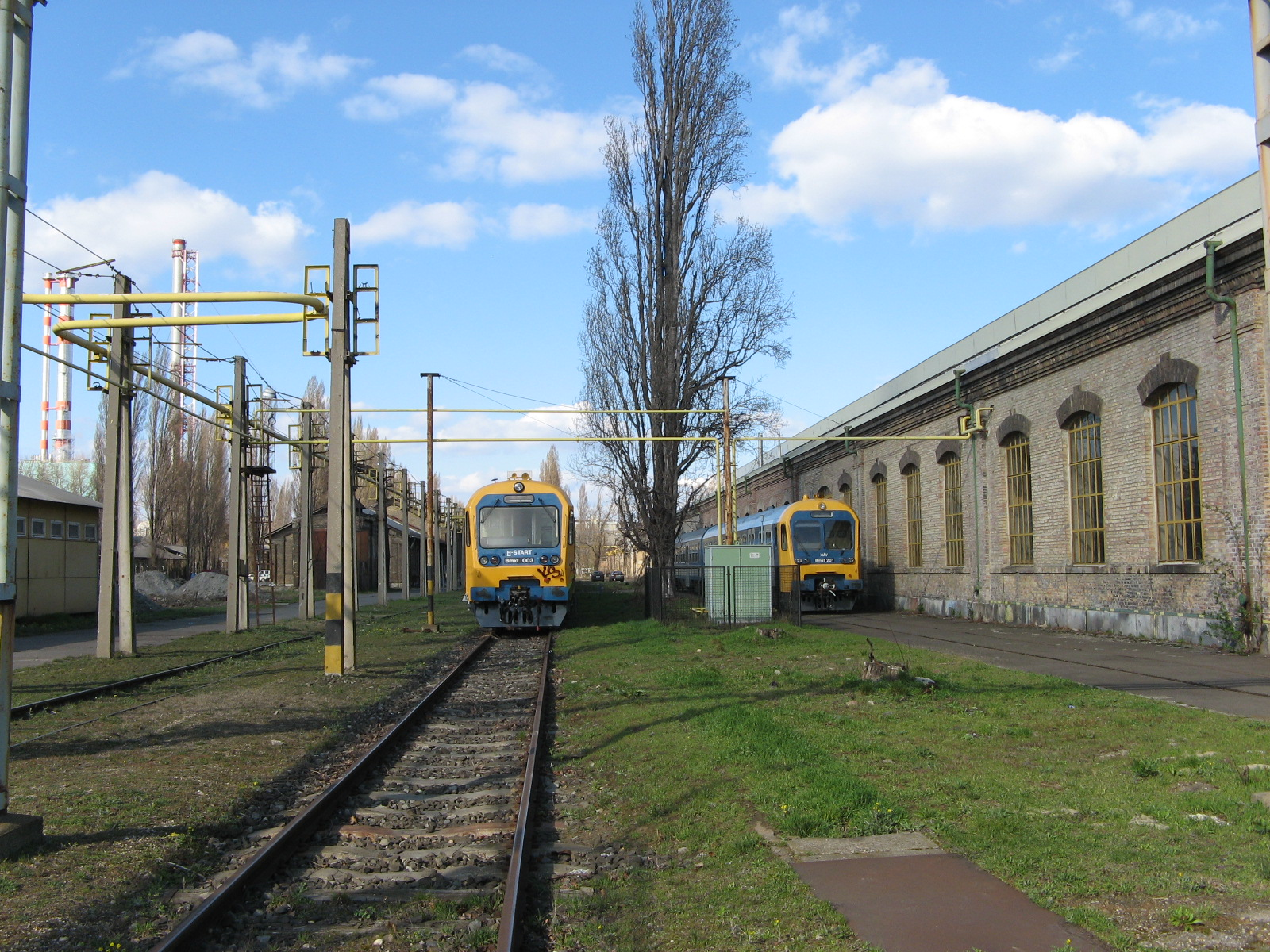

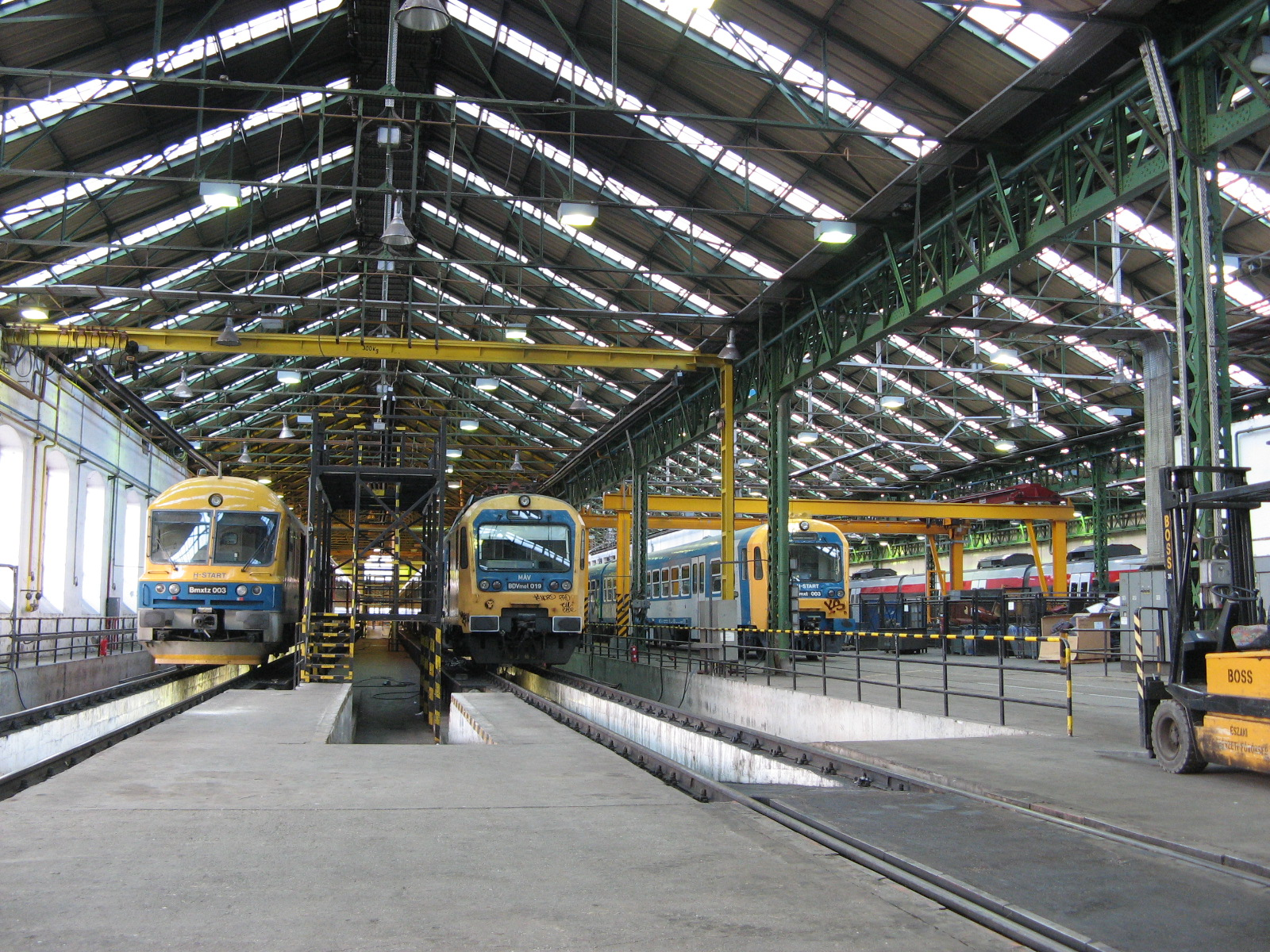

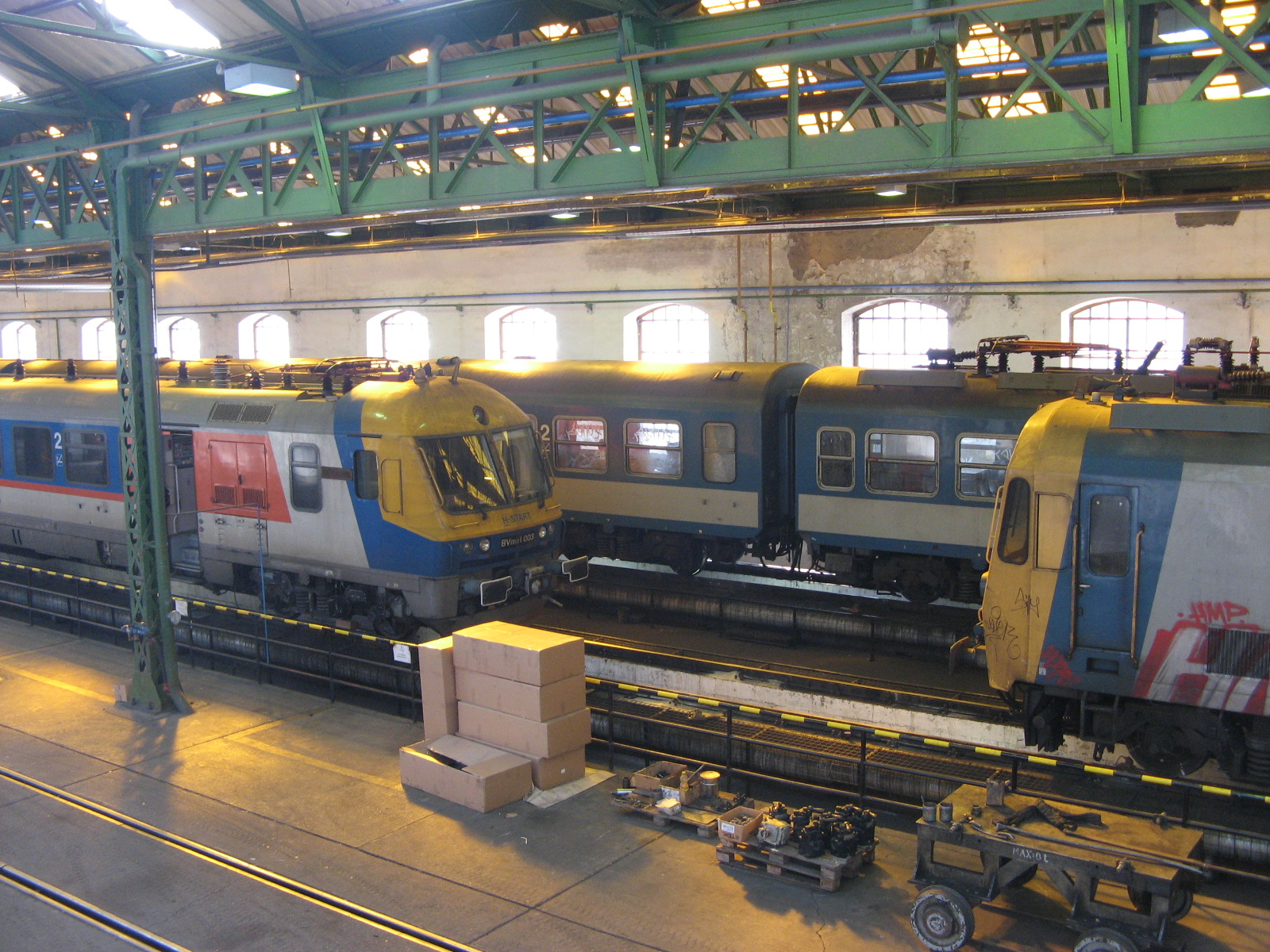

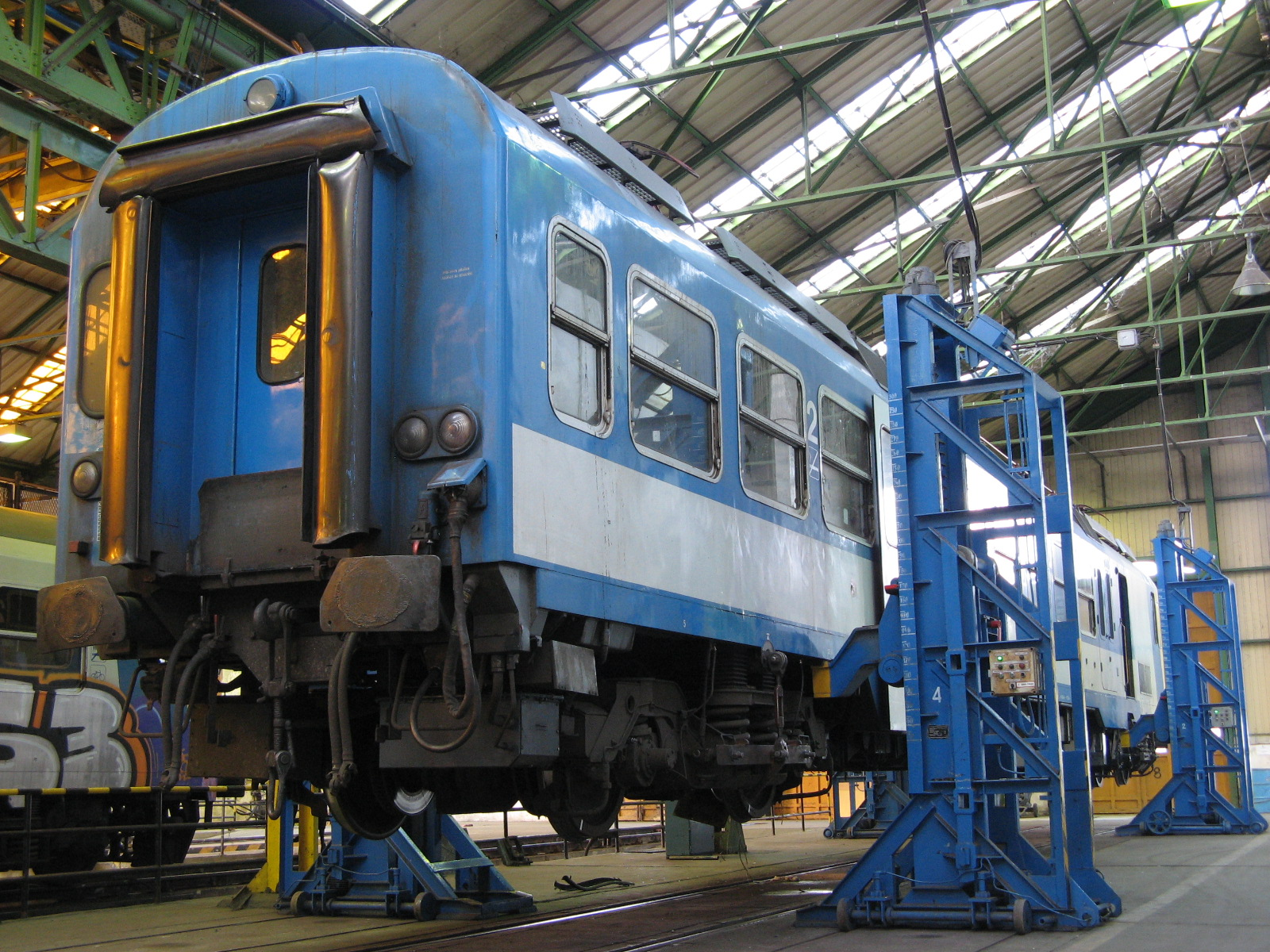

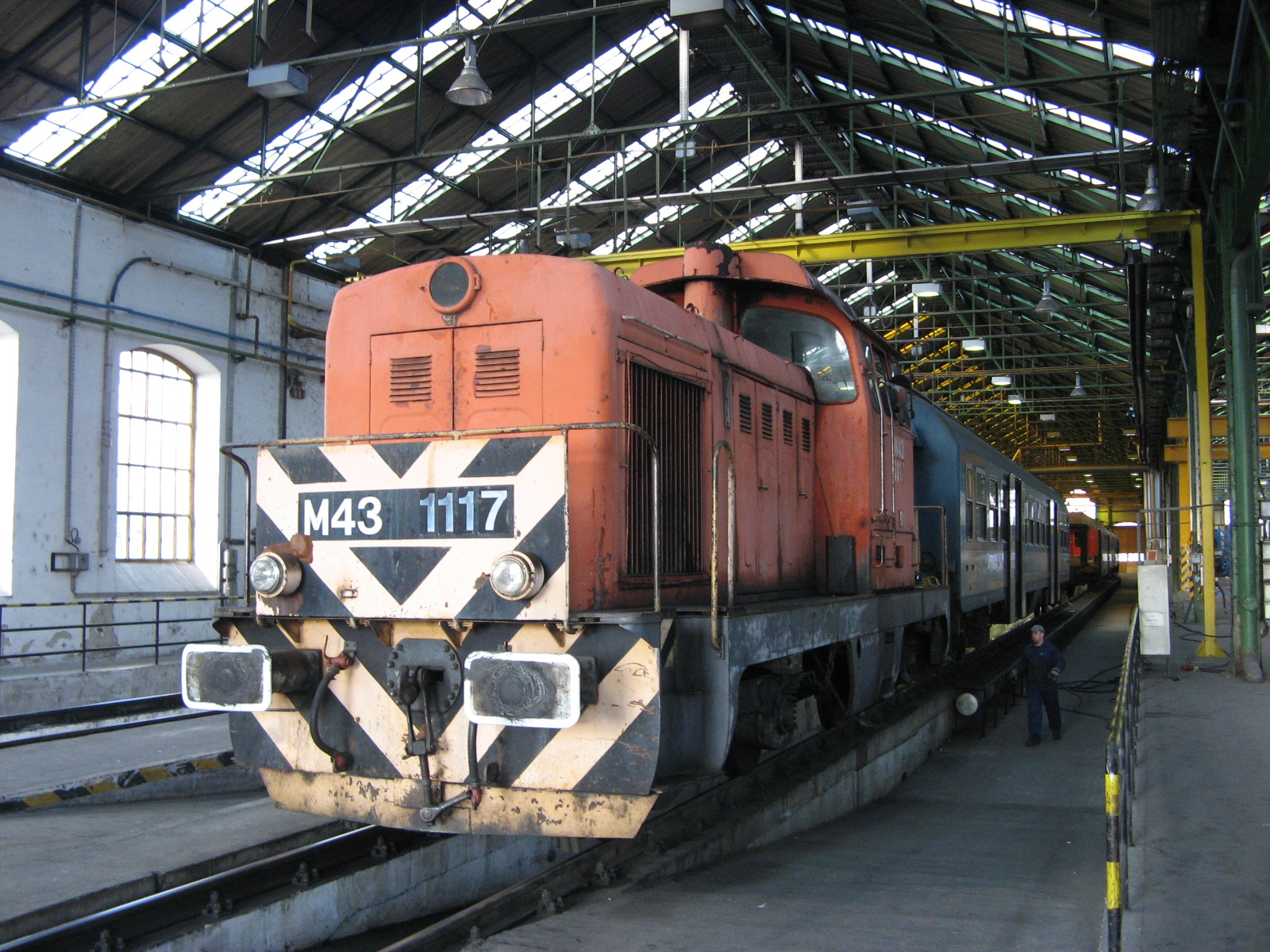

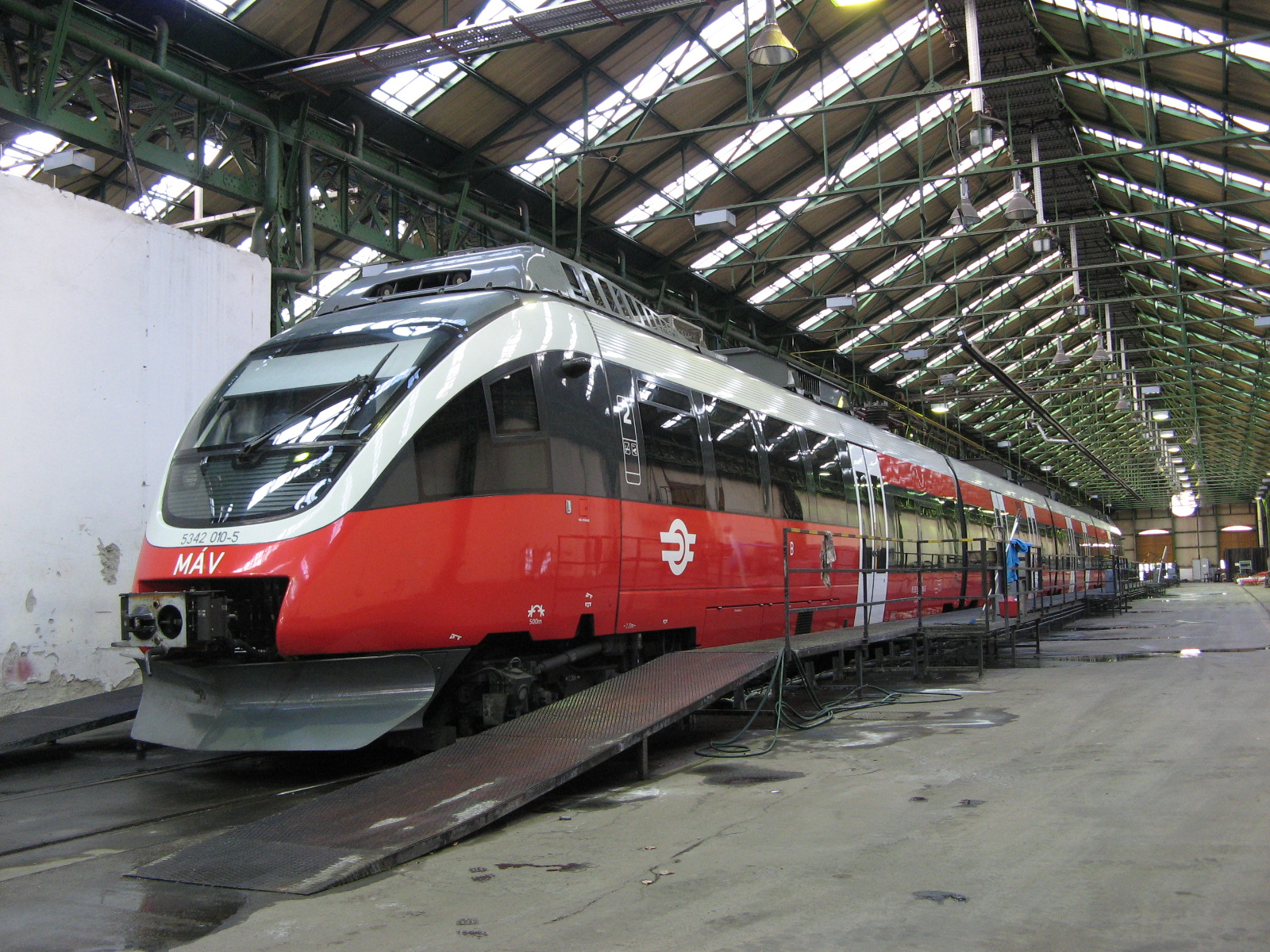

=== The unrenovated, unused portion ===
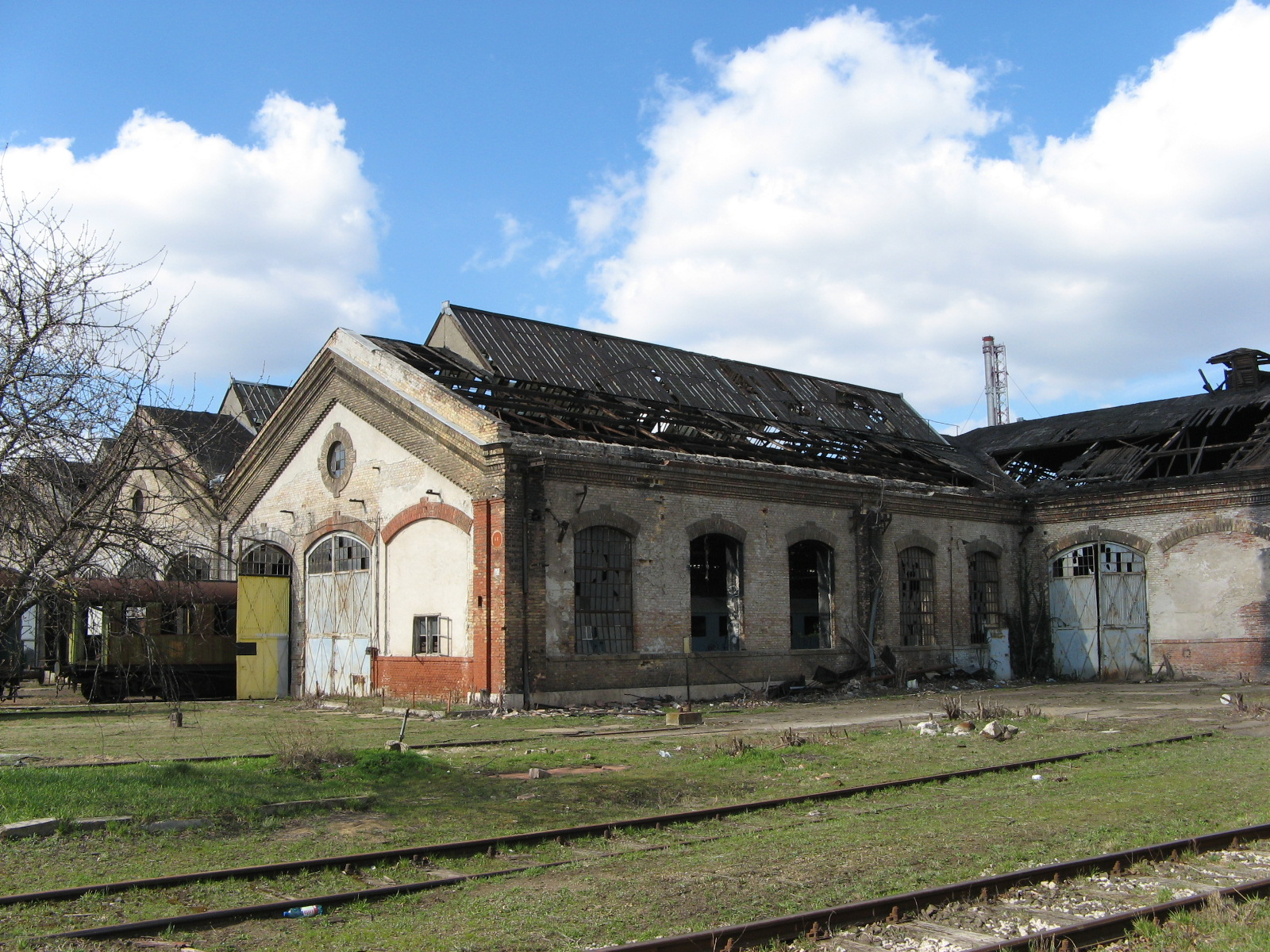

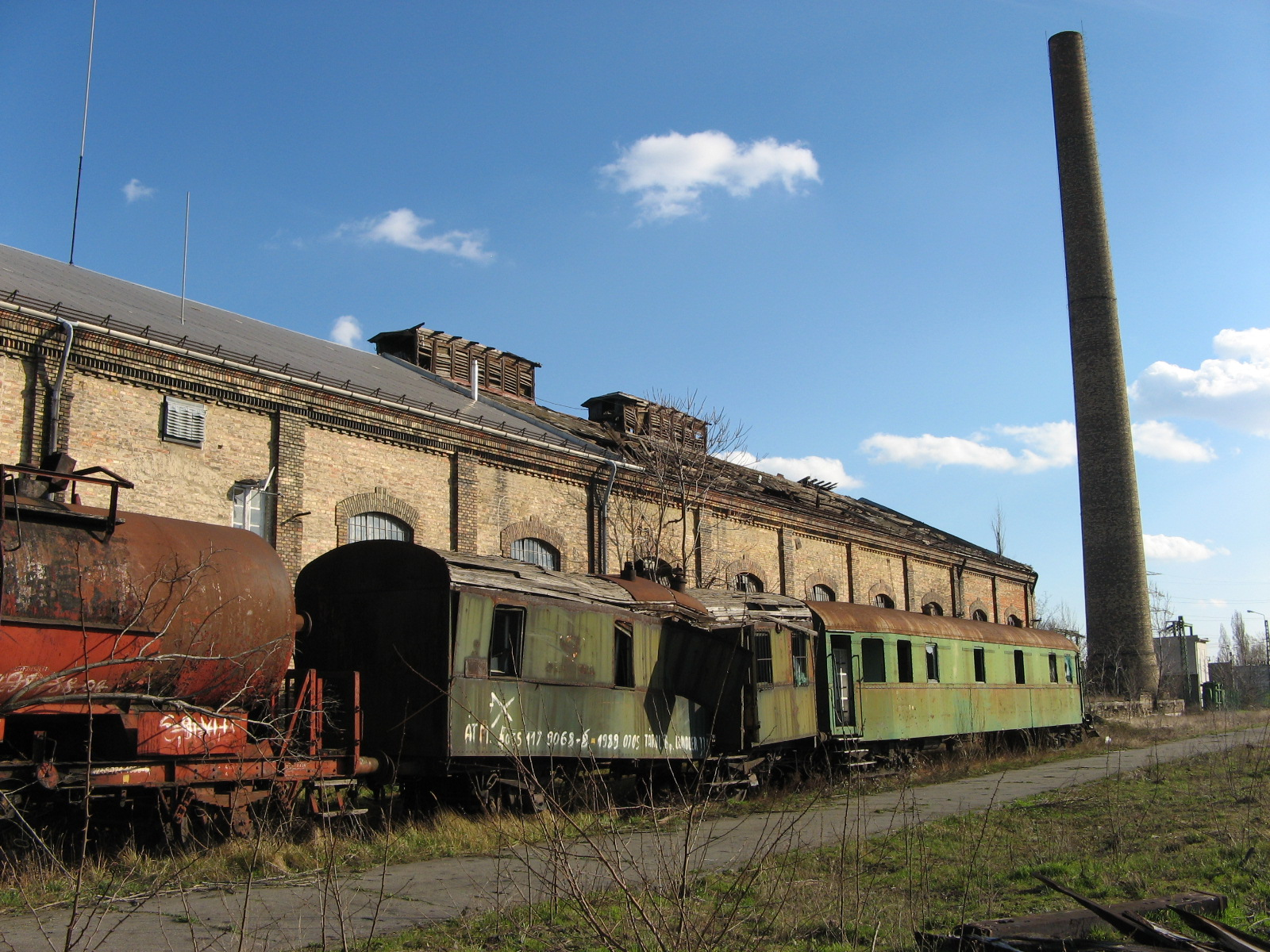

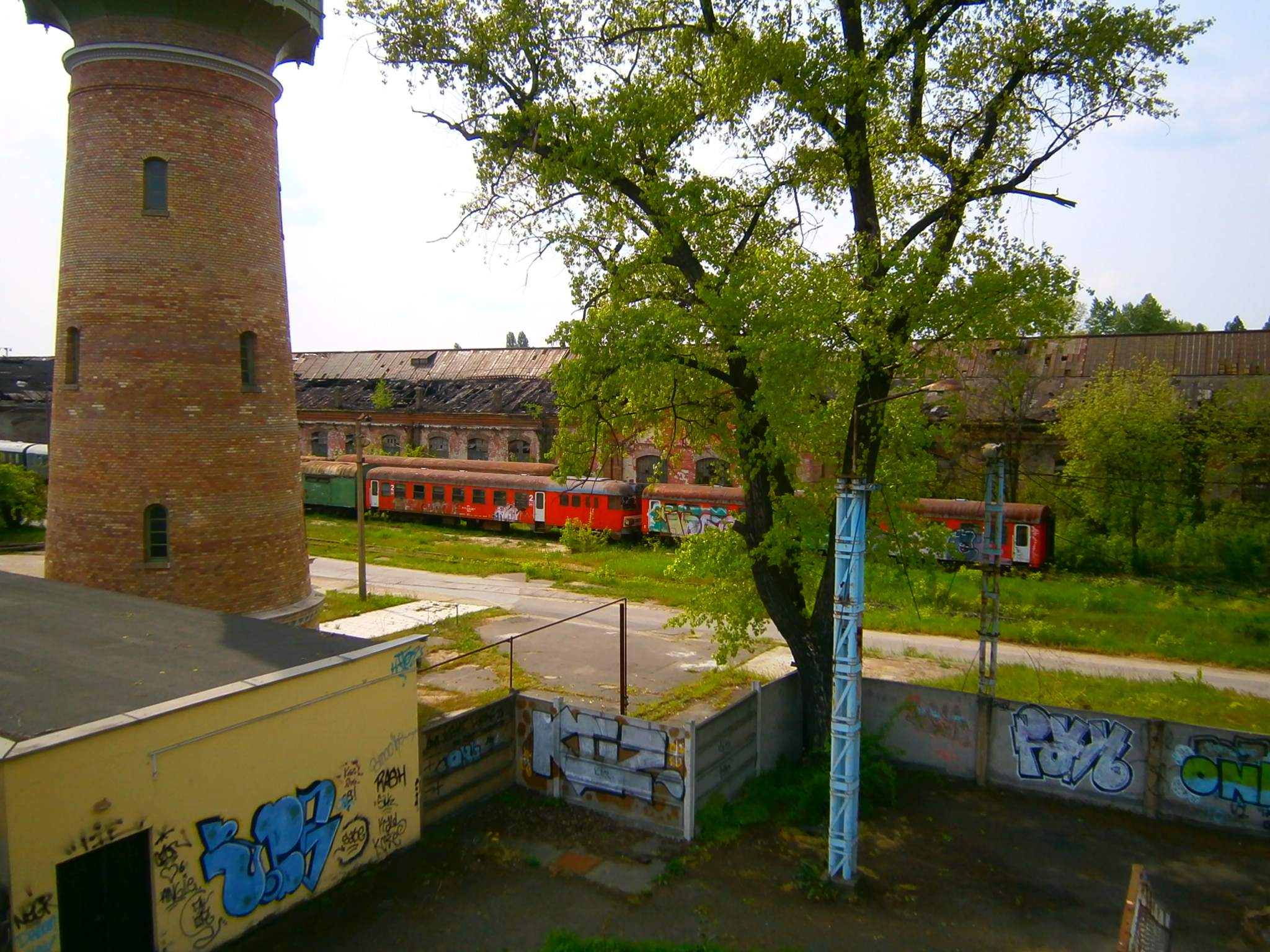

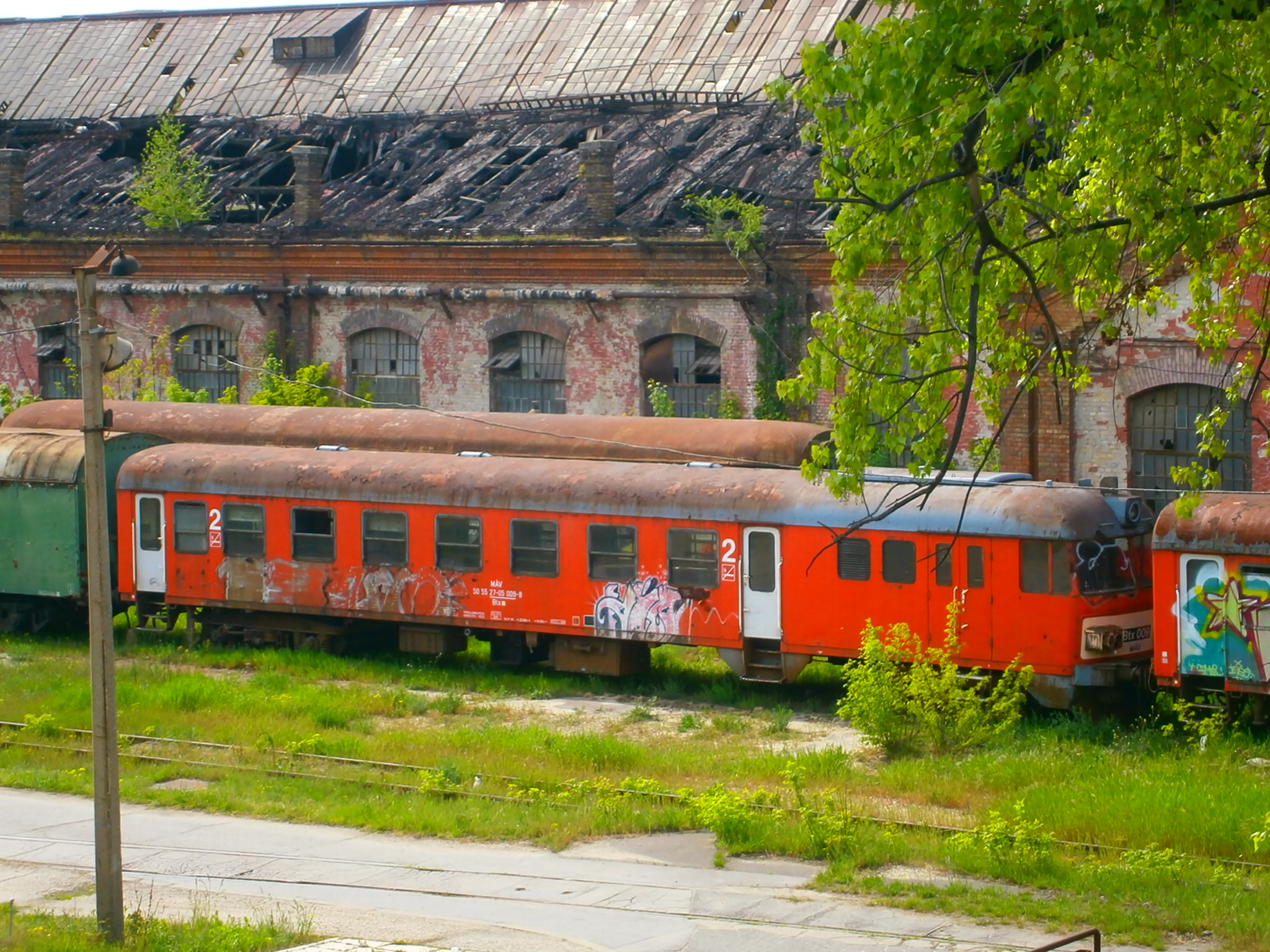

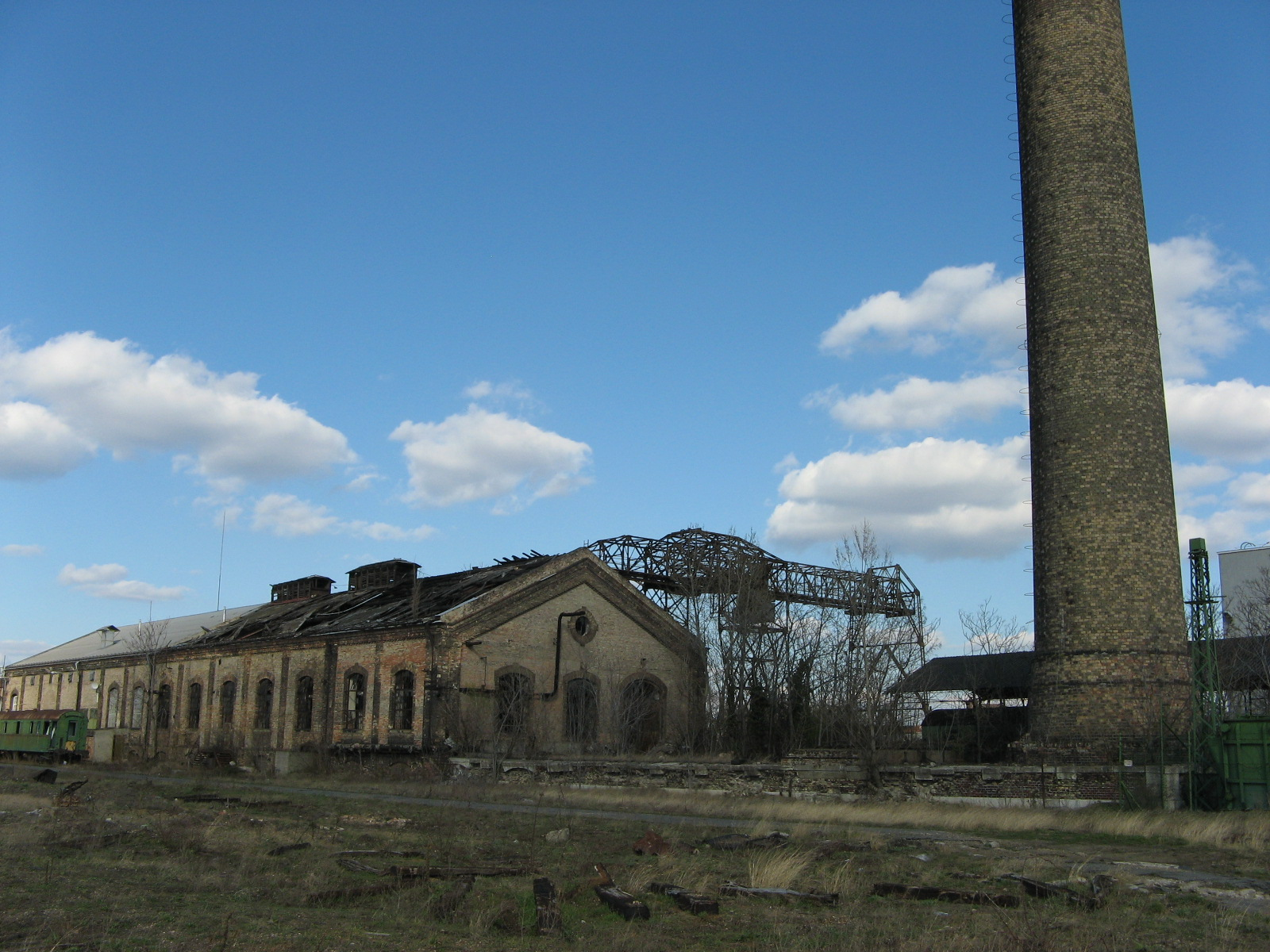

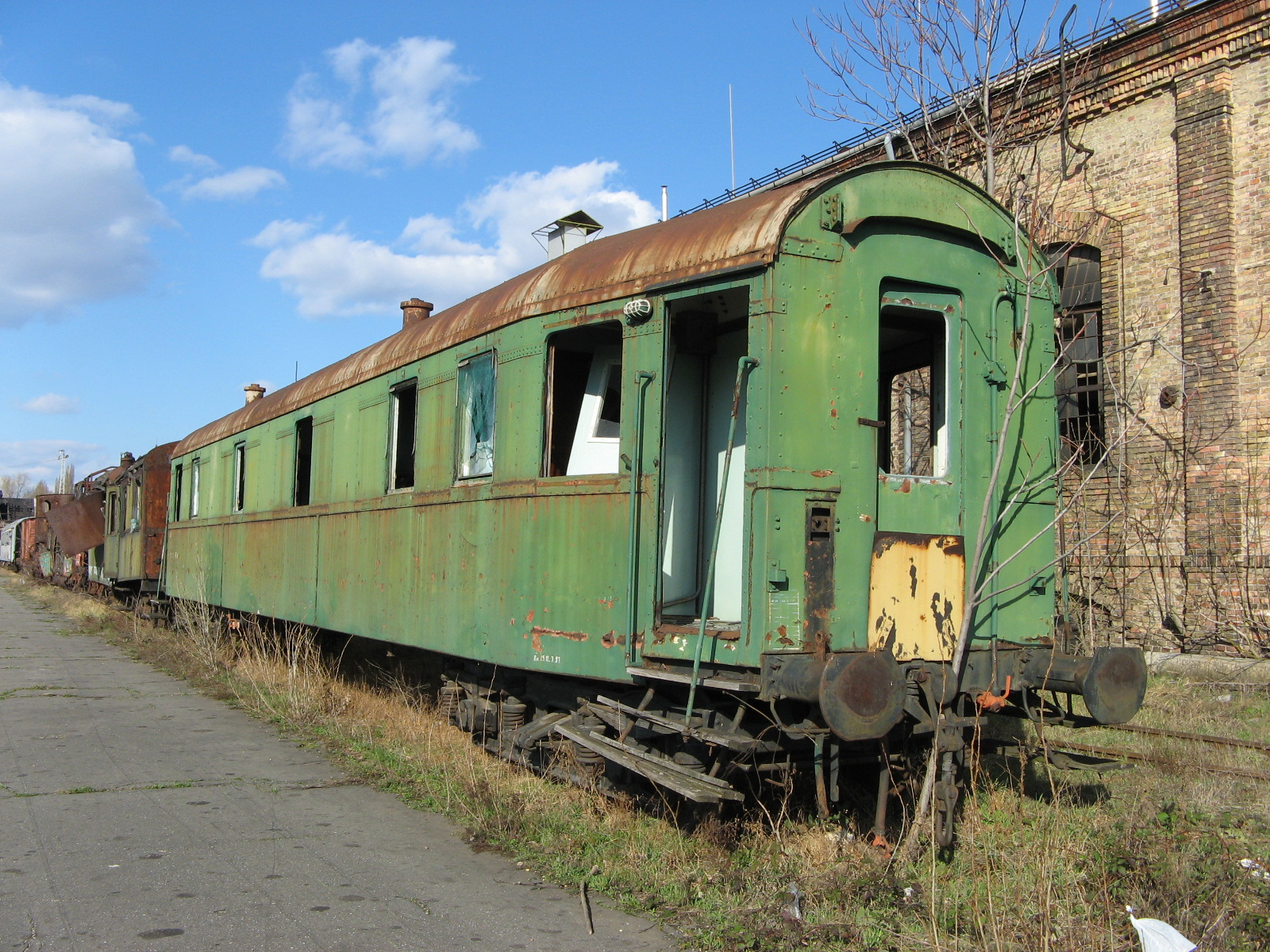

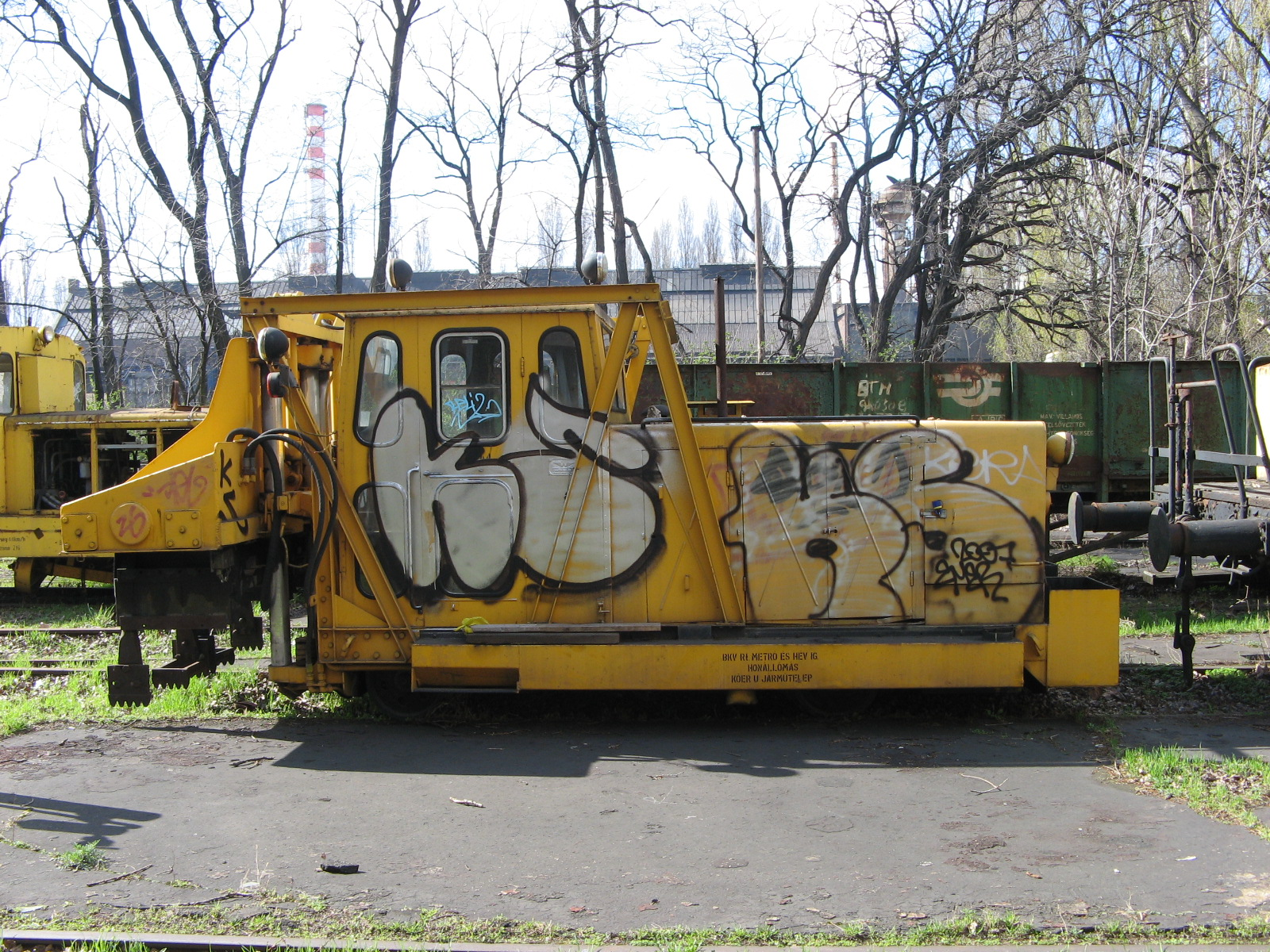

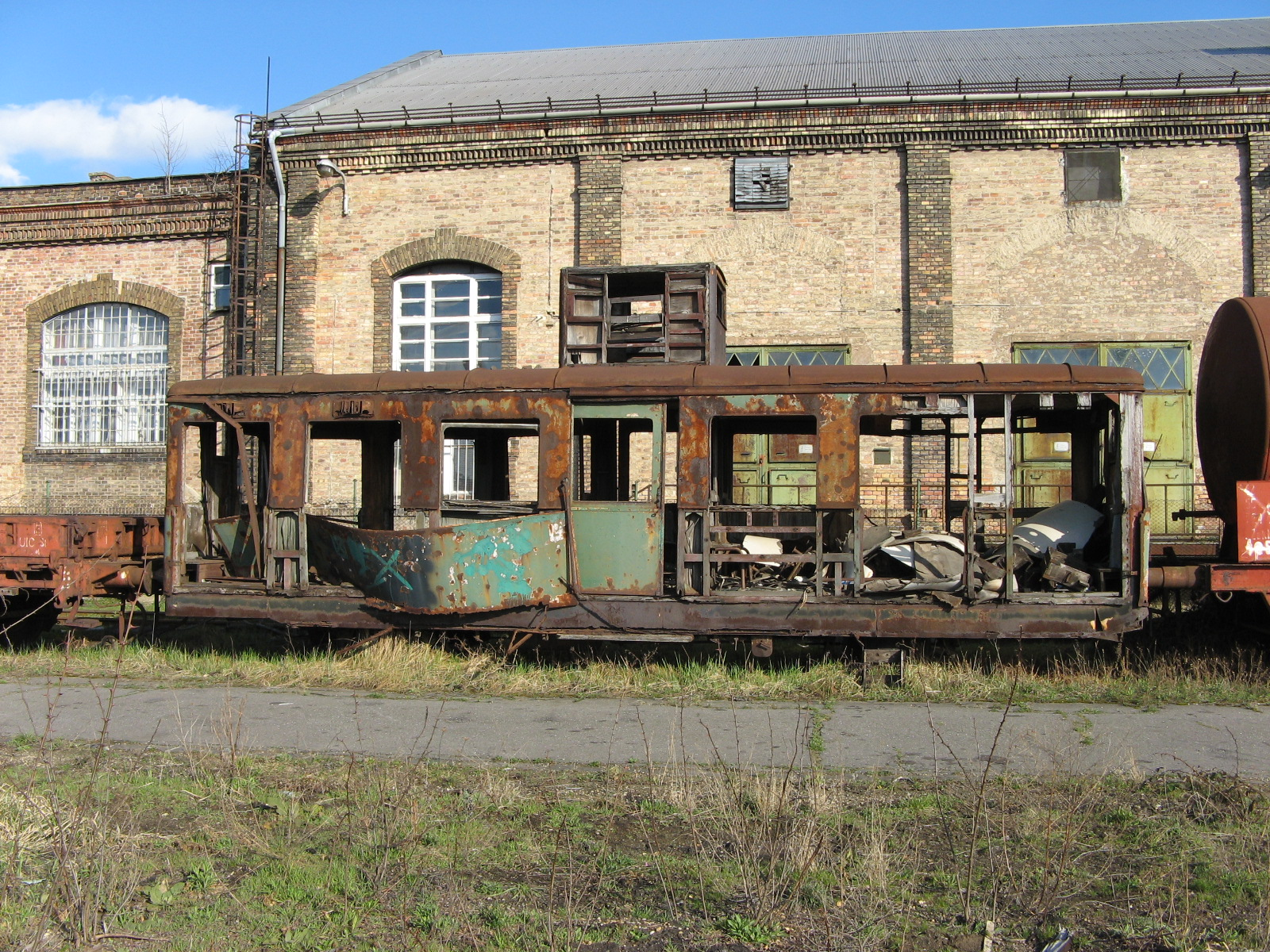

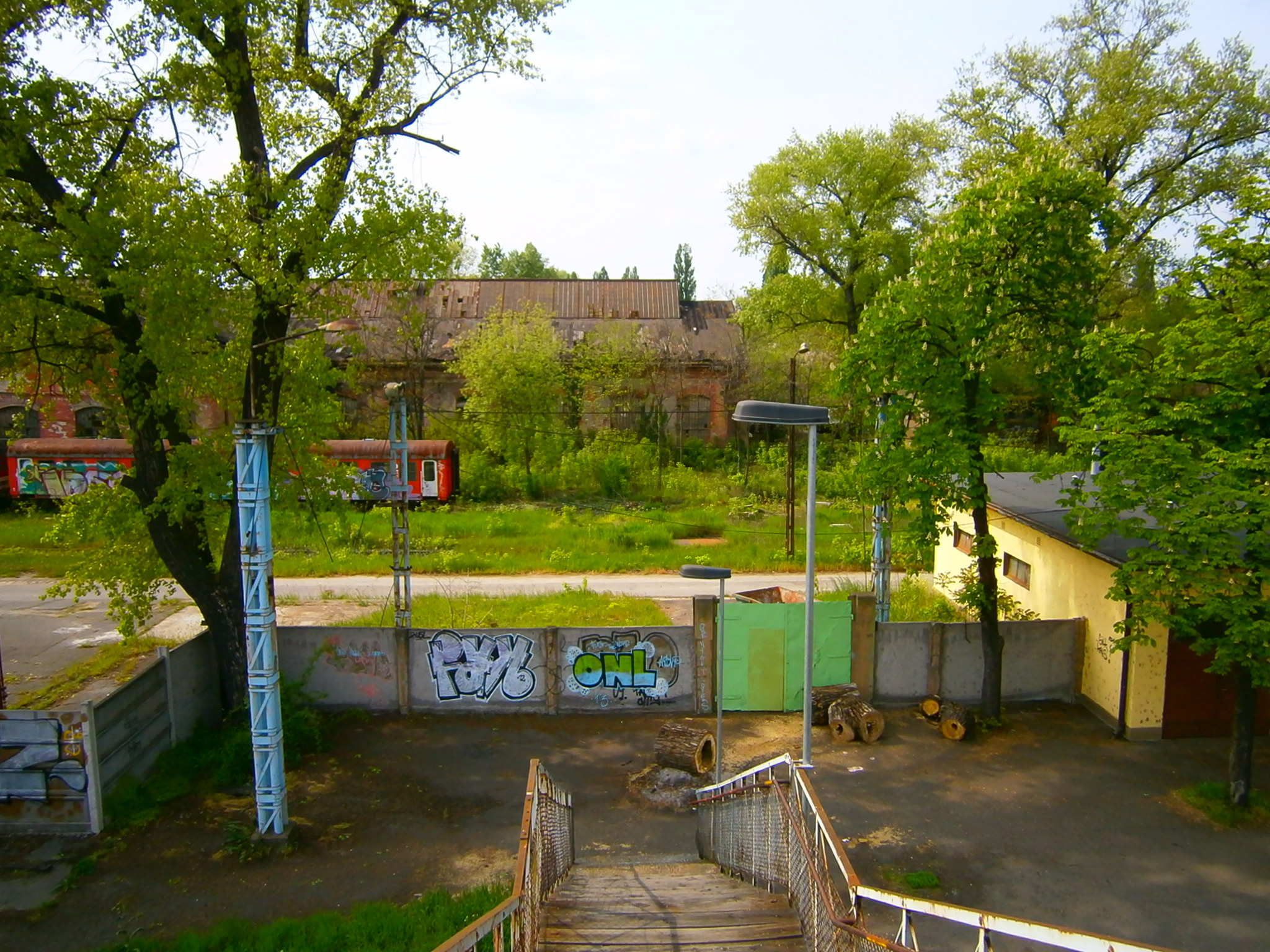

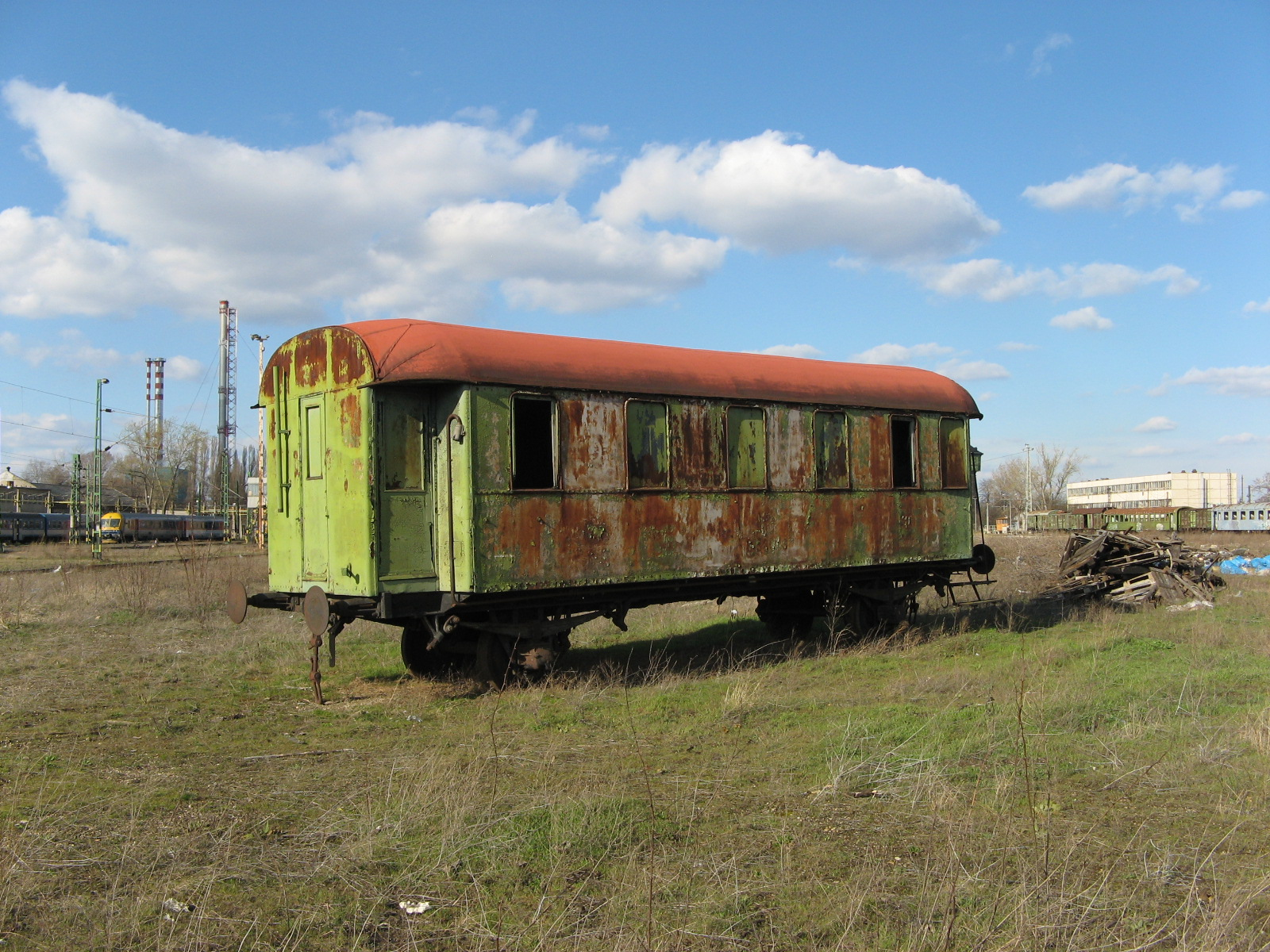

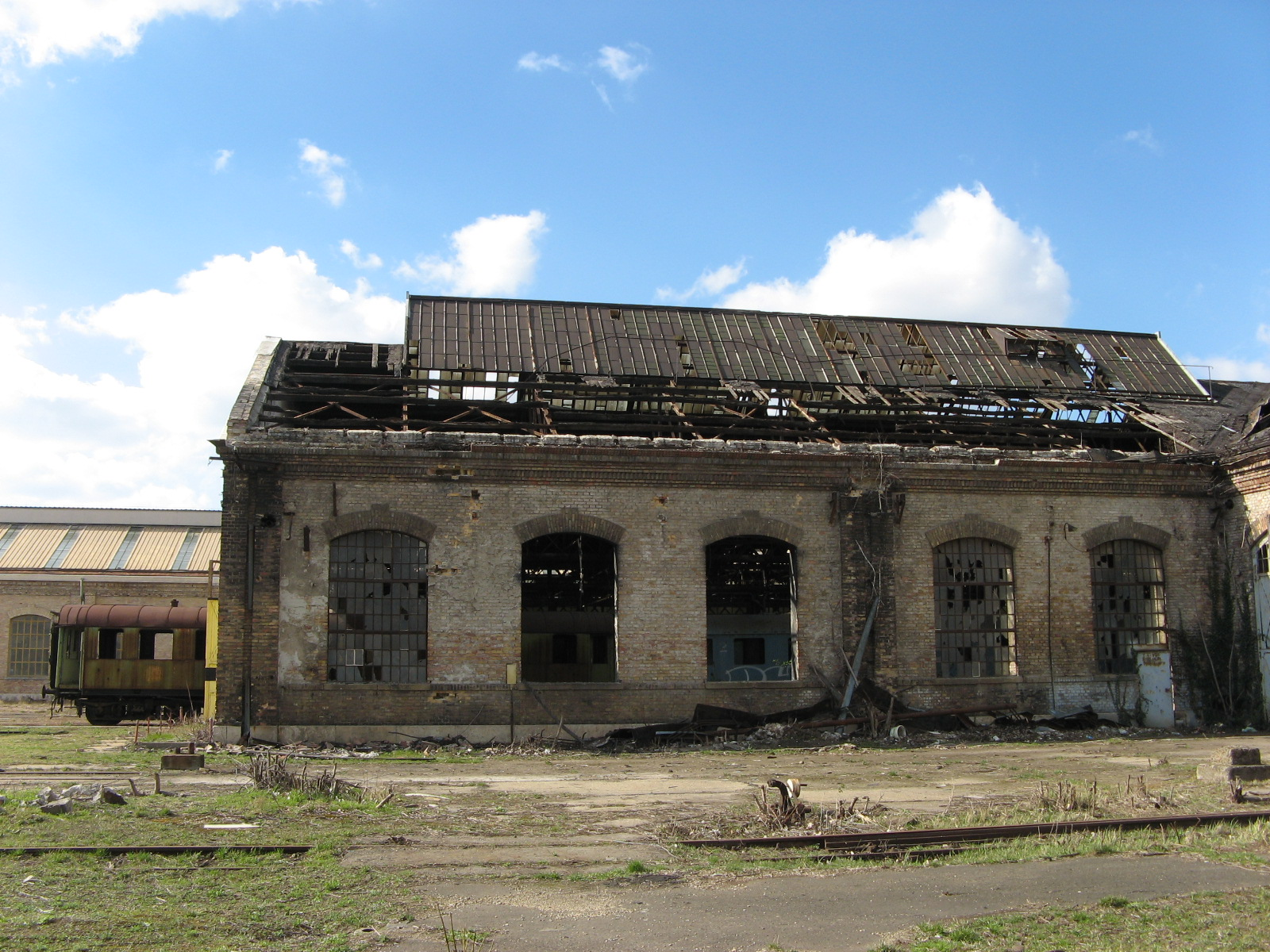

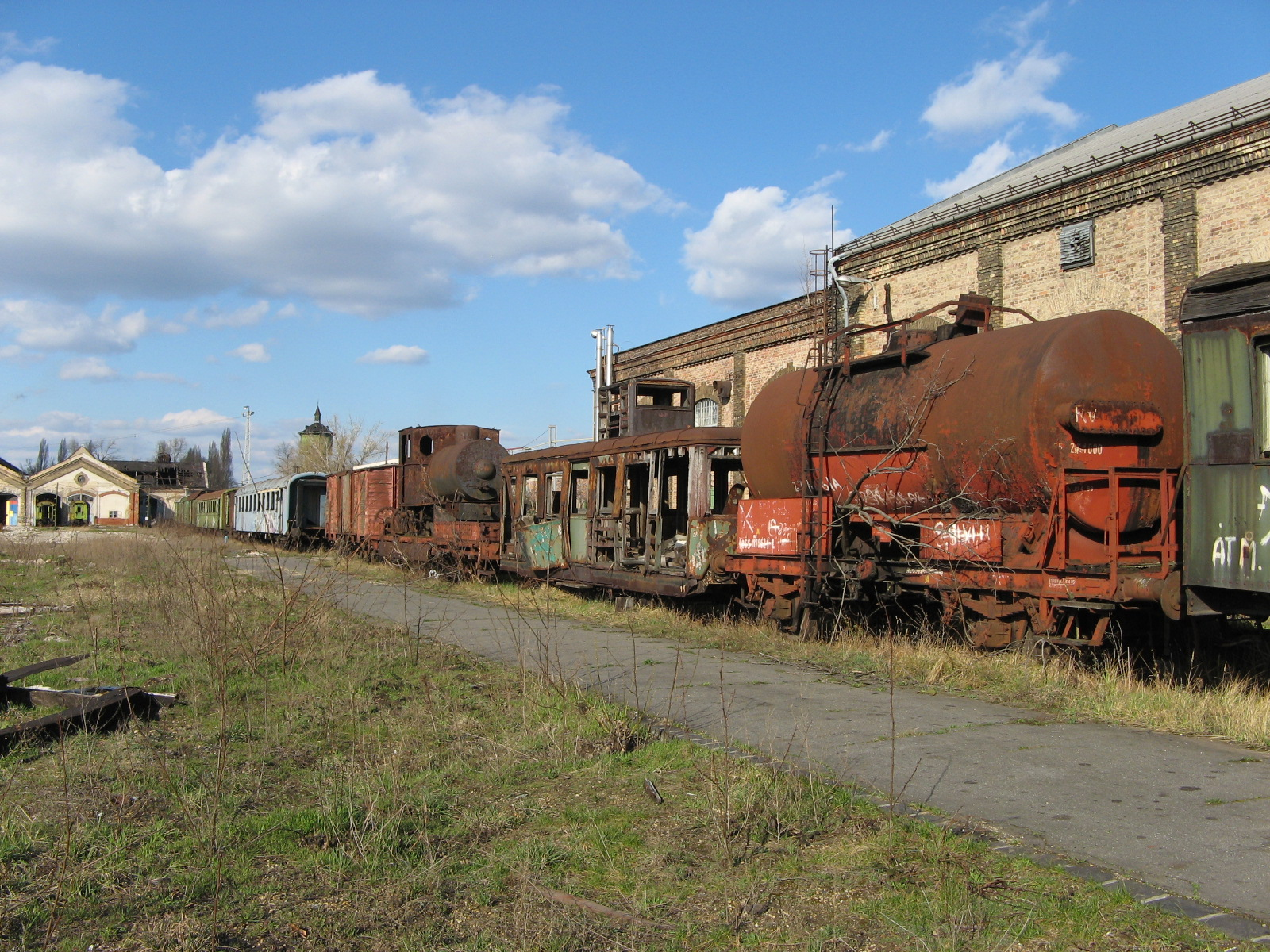

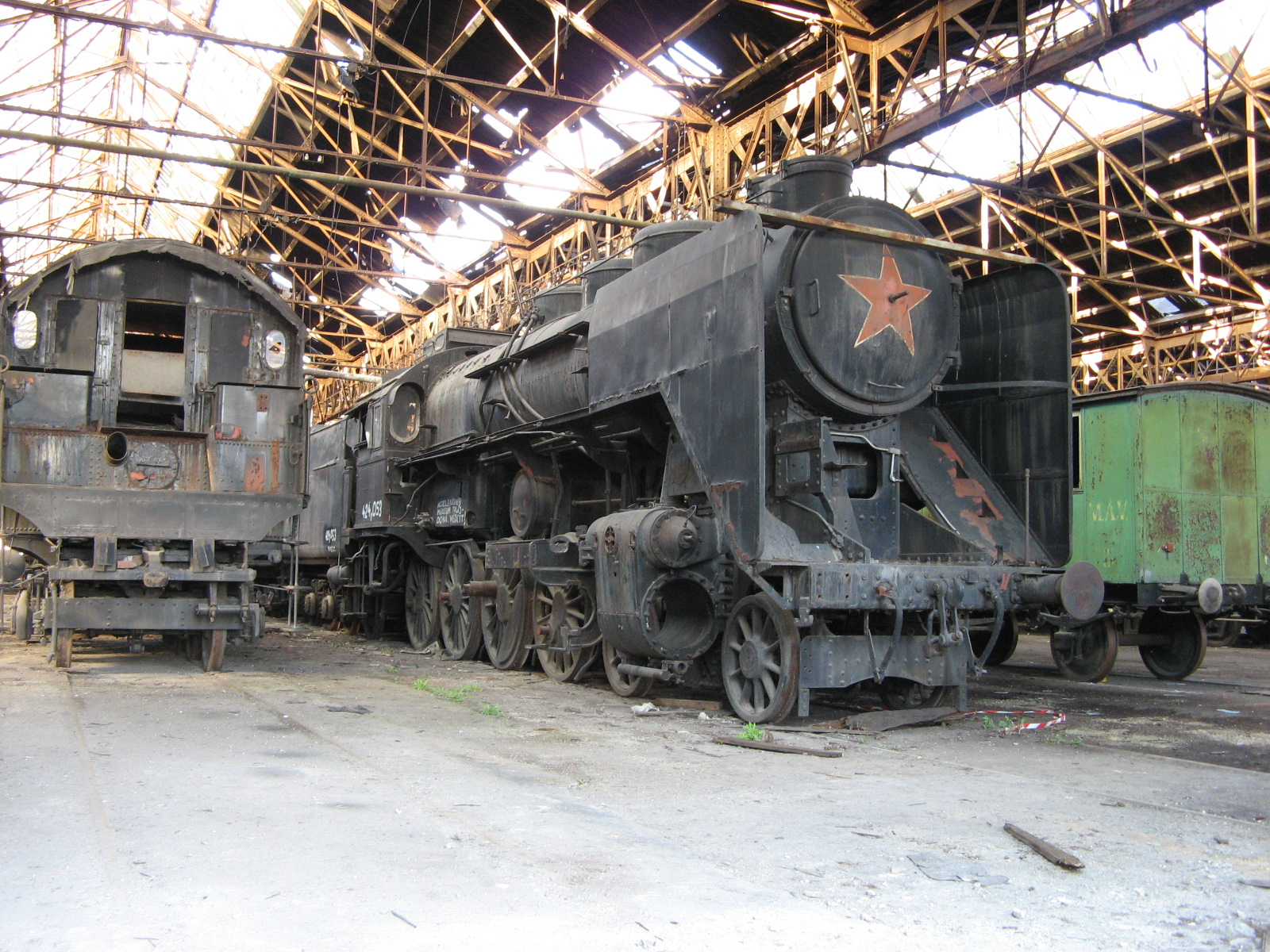

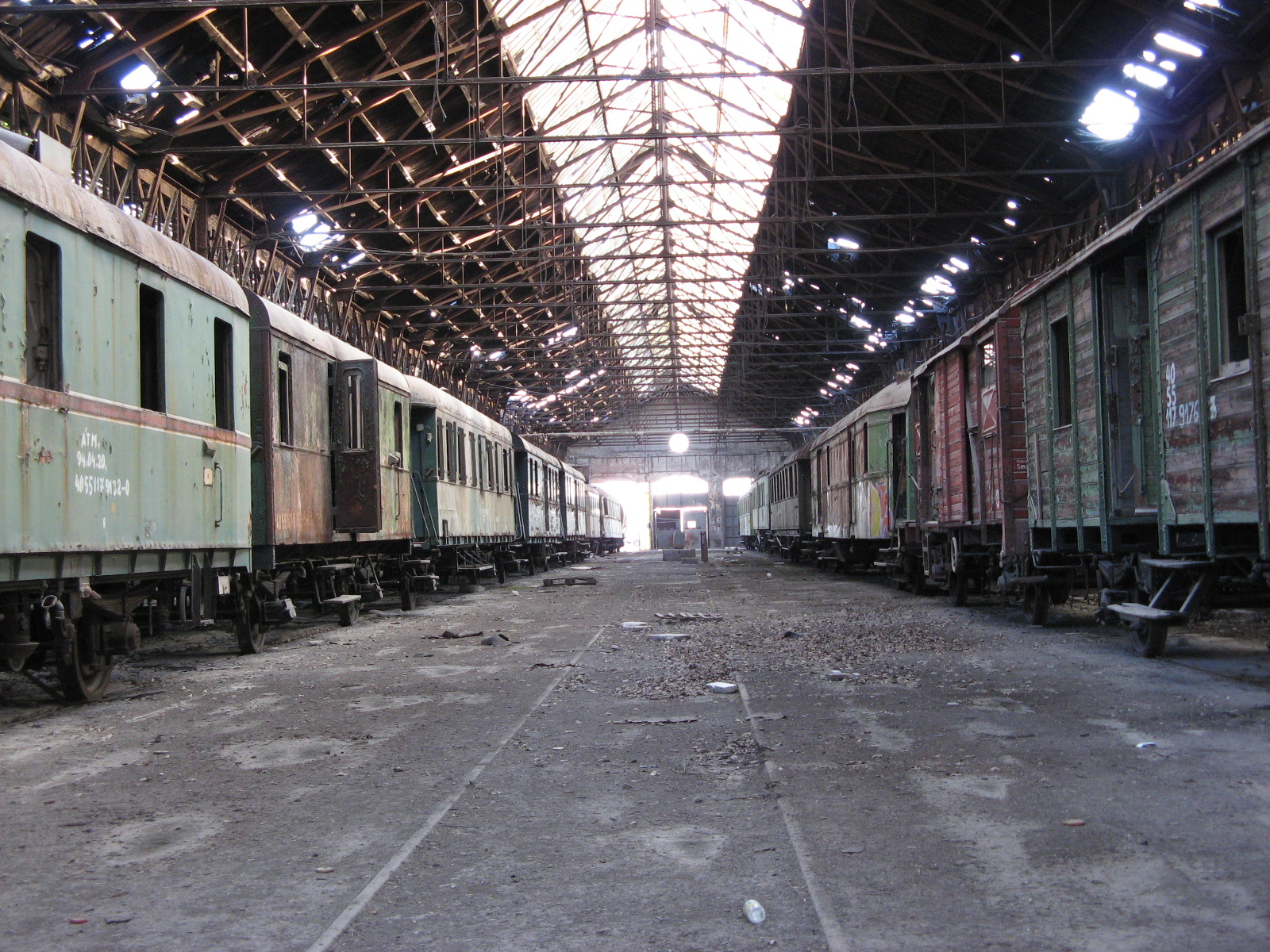

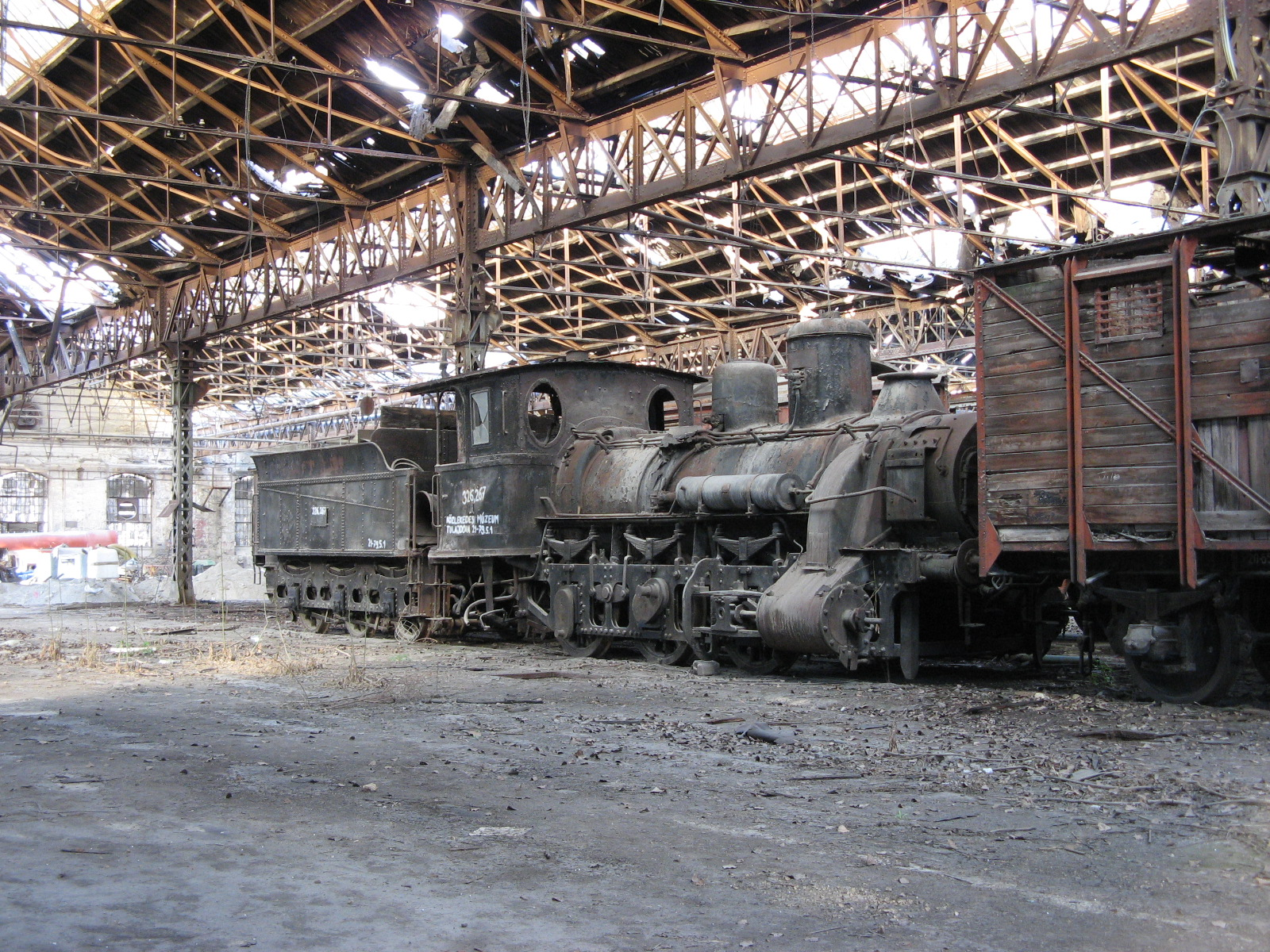

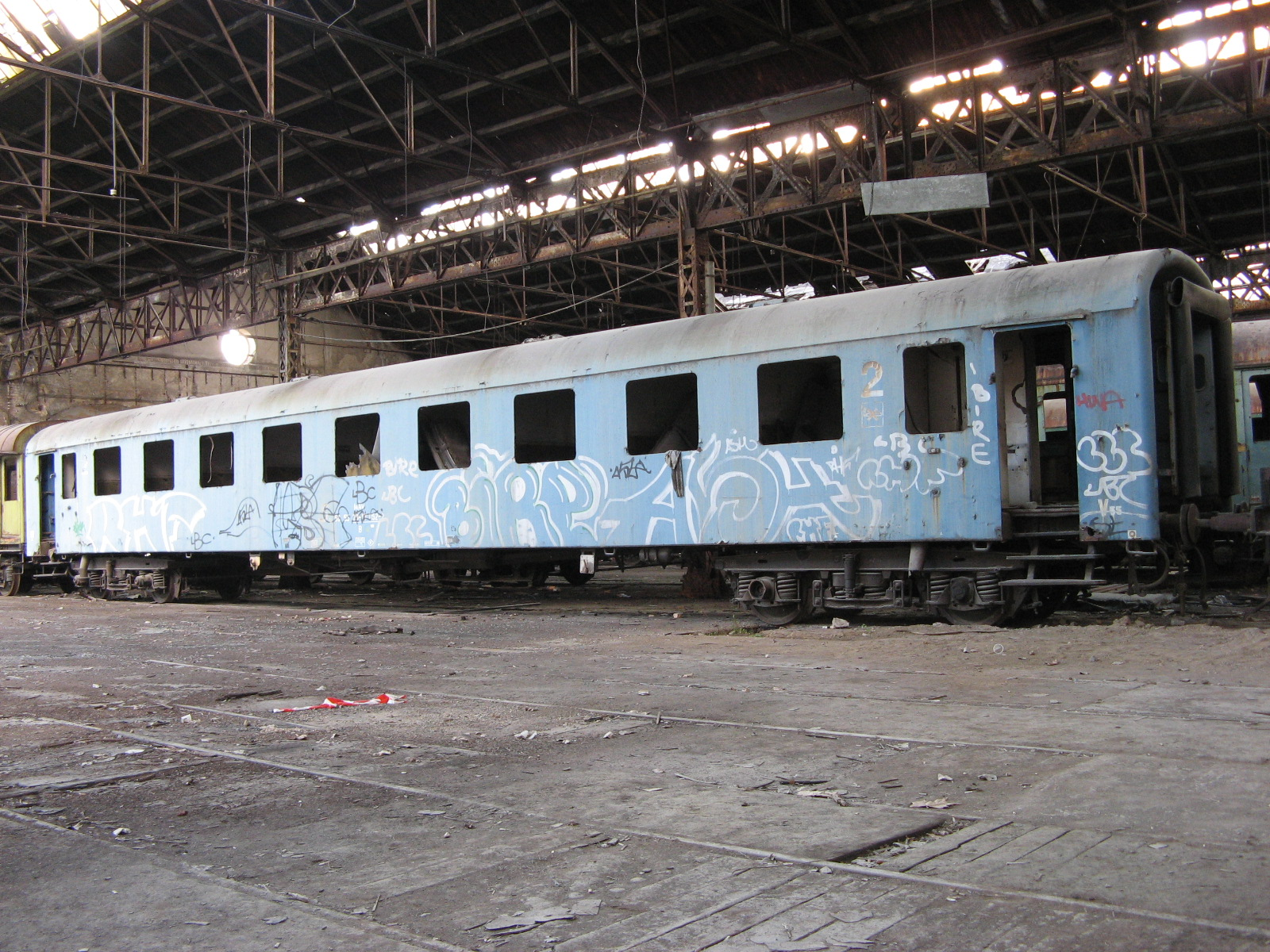

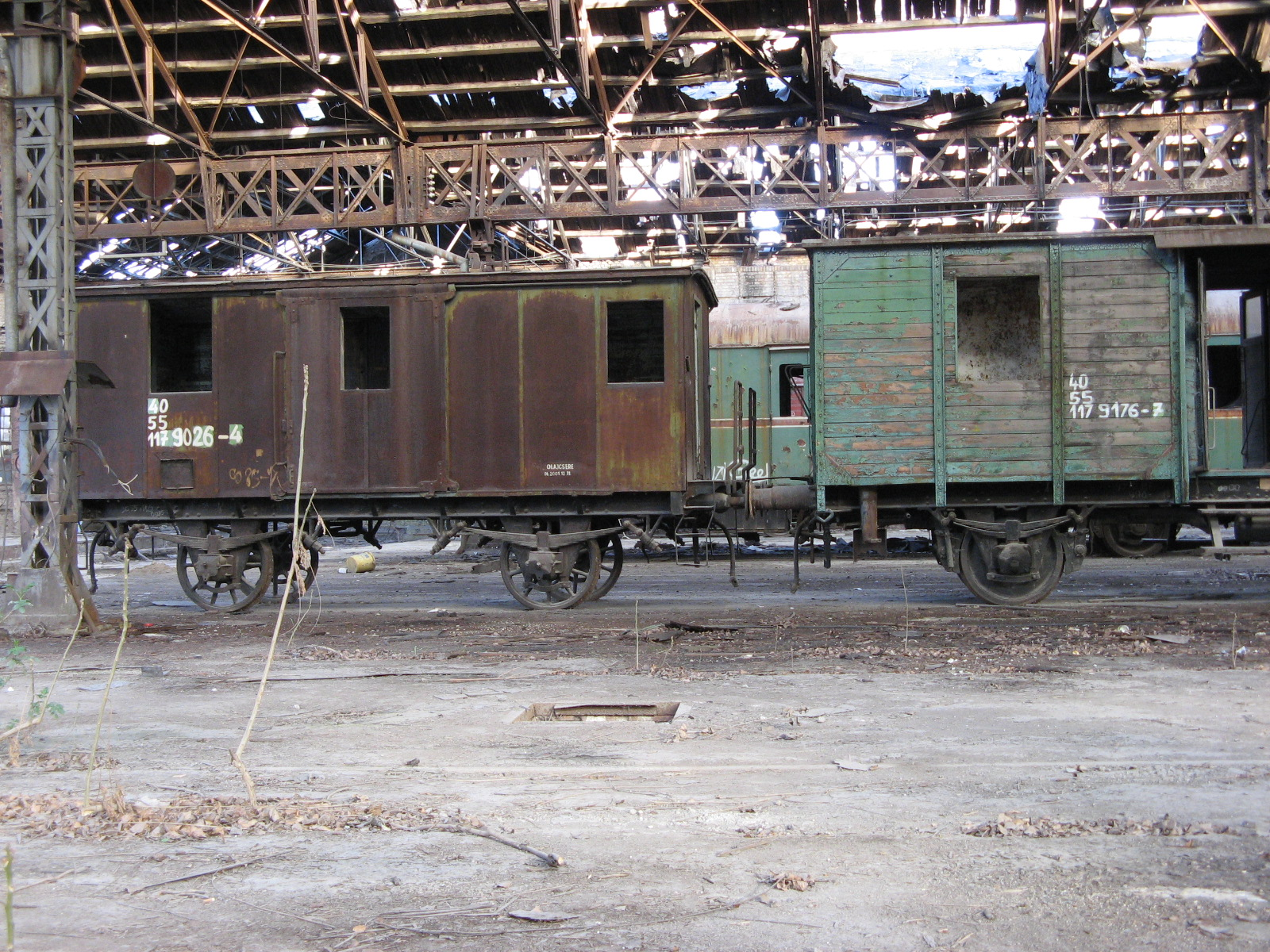

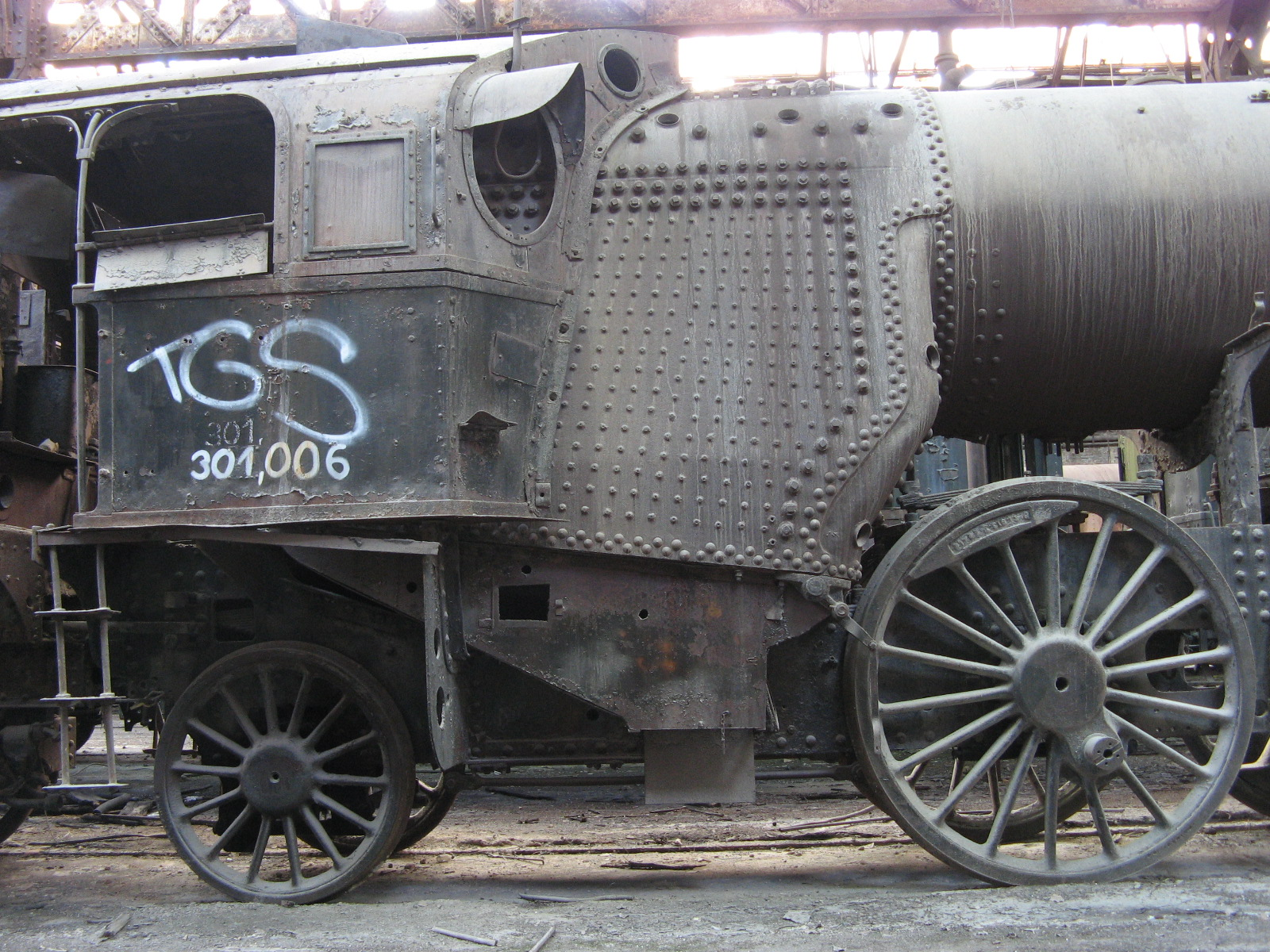

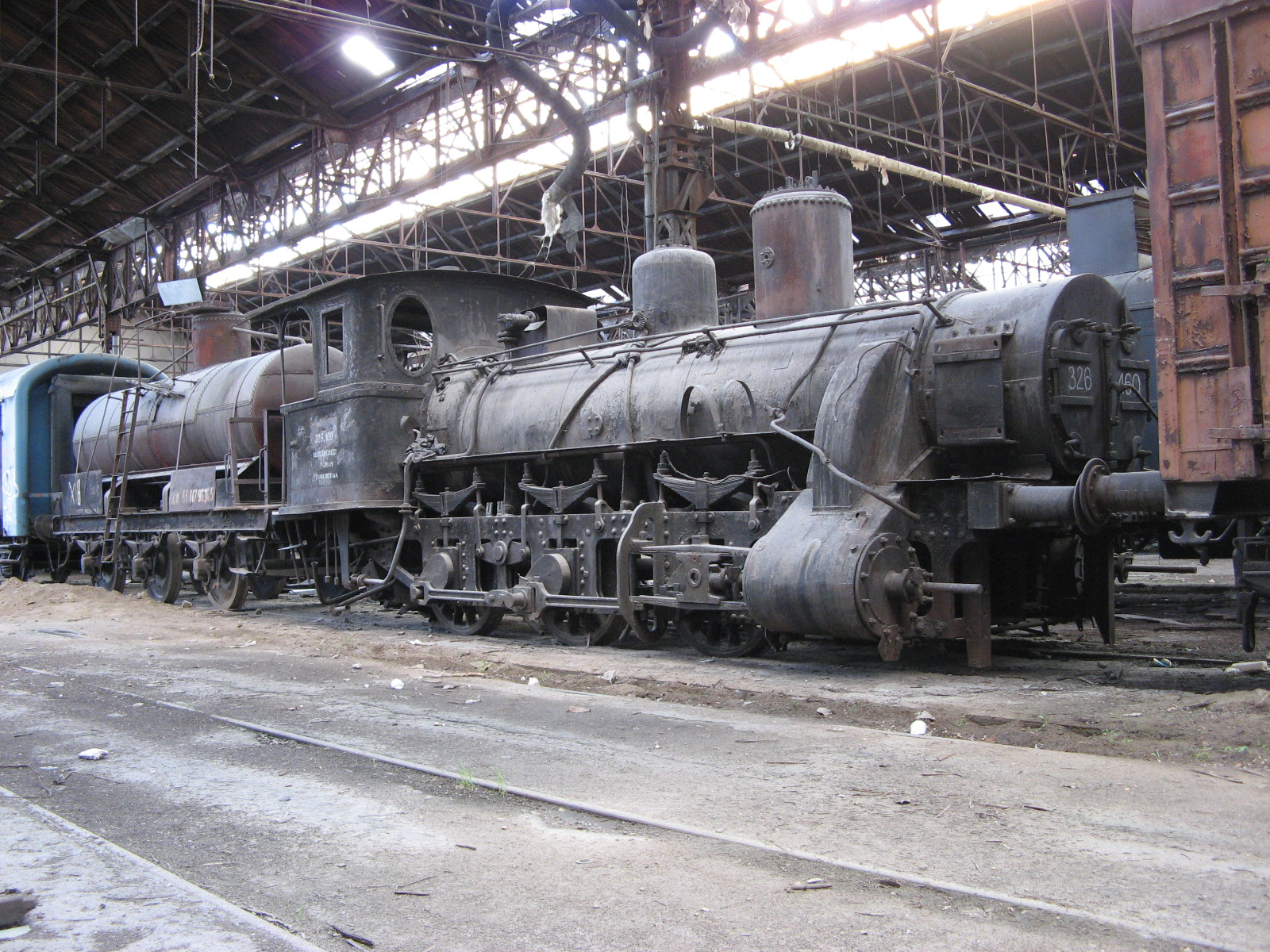

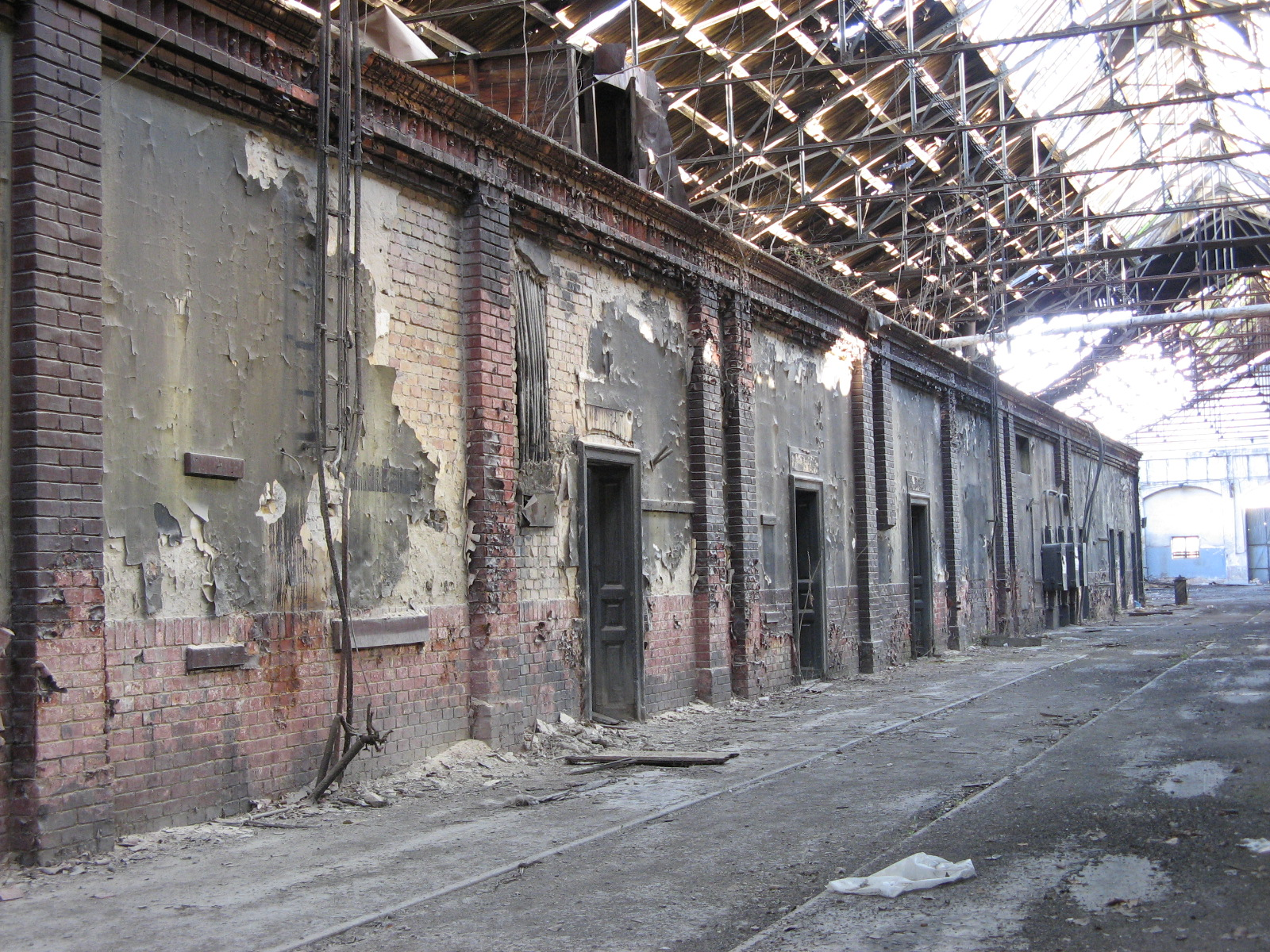

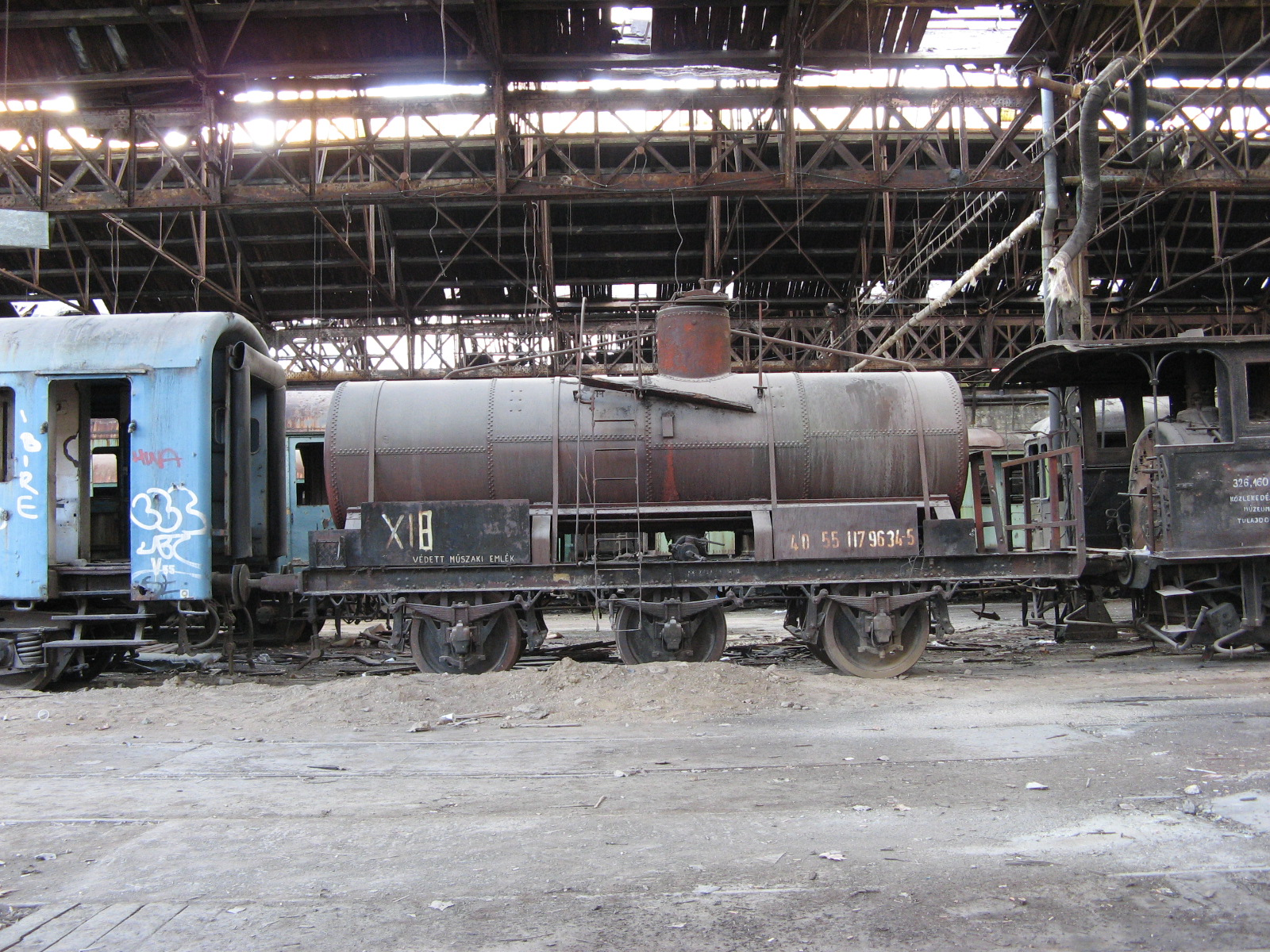

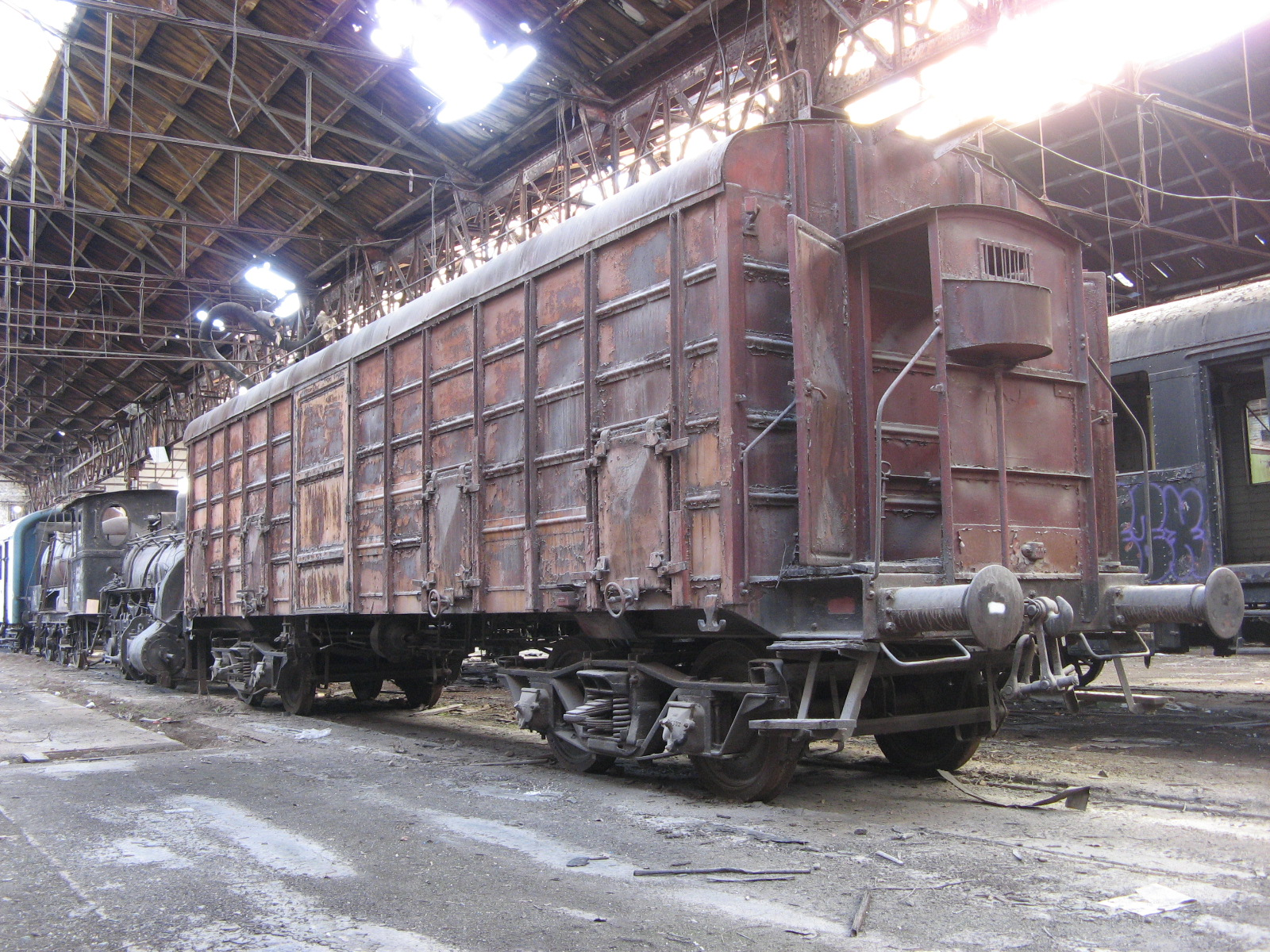

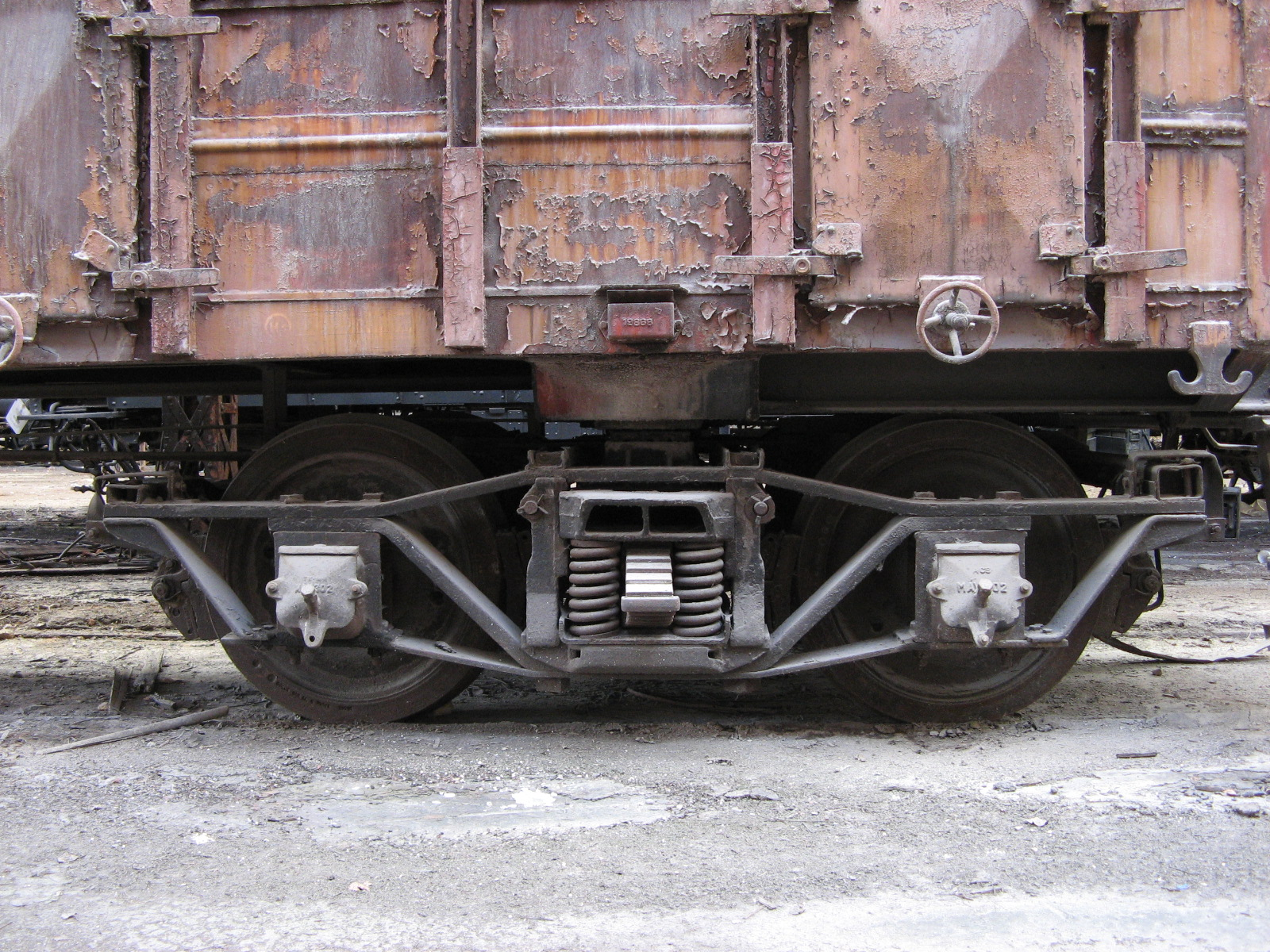

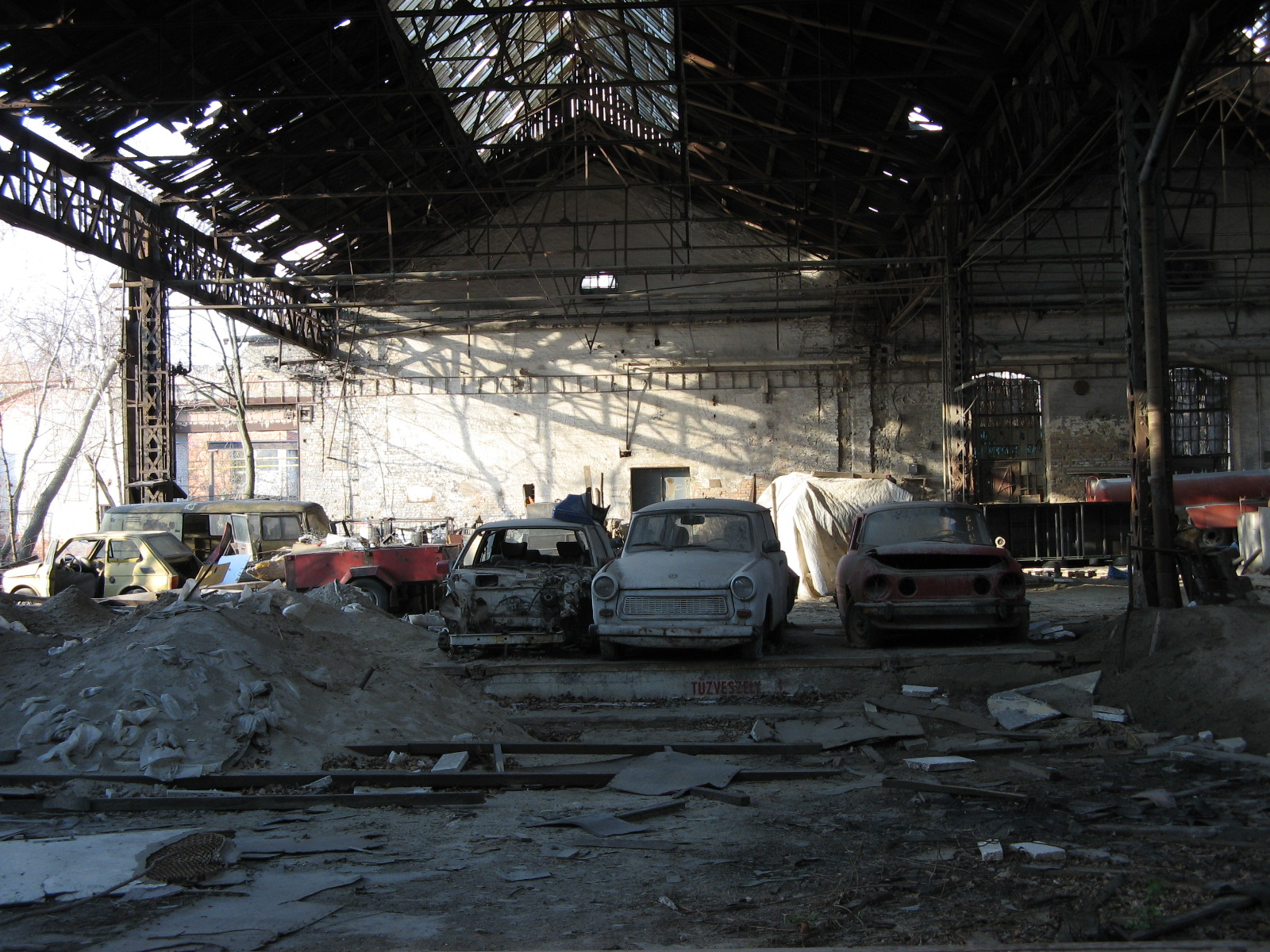

== Citations ==
- Varga Károly. "A magyarországi vasúti járműjavító műhelyek (főműhelyek) története megalakulásuktól". Magyar Vasúttörténet (3. kötet ed.). Budapest: Közdok Rt. ISBN 963-552-311-4.
- Közlekedéstudományi szemle: LV. évfolyam 4. szám, Közdok ISSN 0023-4362
