= Hungarian Railway History Park =

Coordinates: 47.5419°N 19.0986°E

- Magyar Vasúttörténeti Park
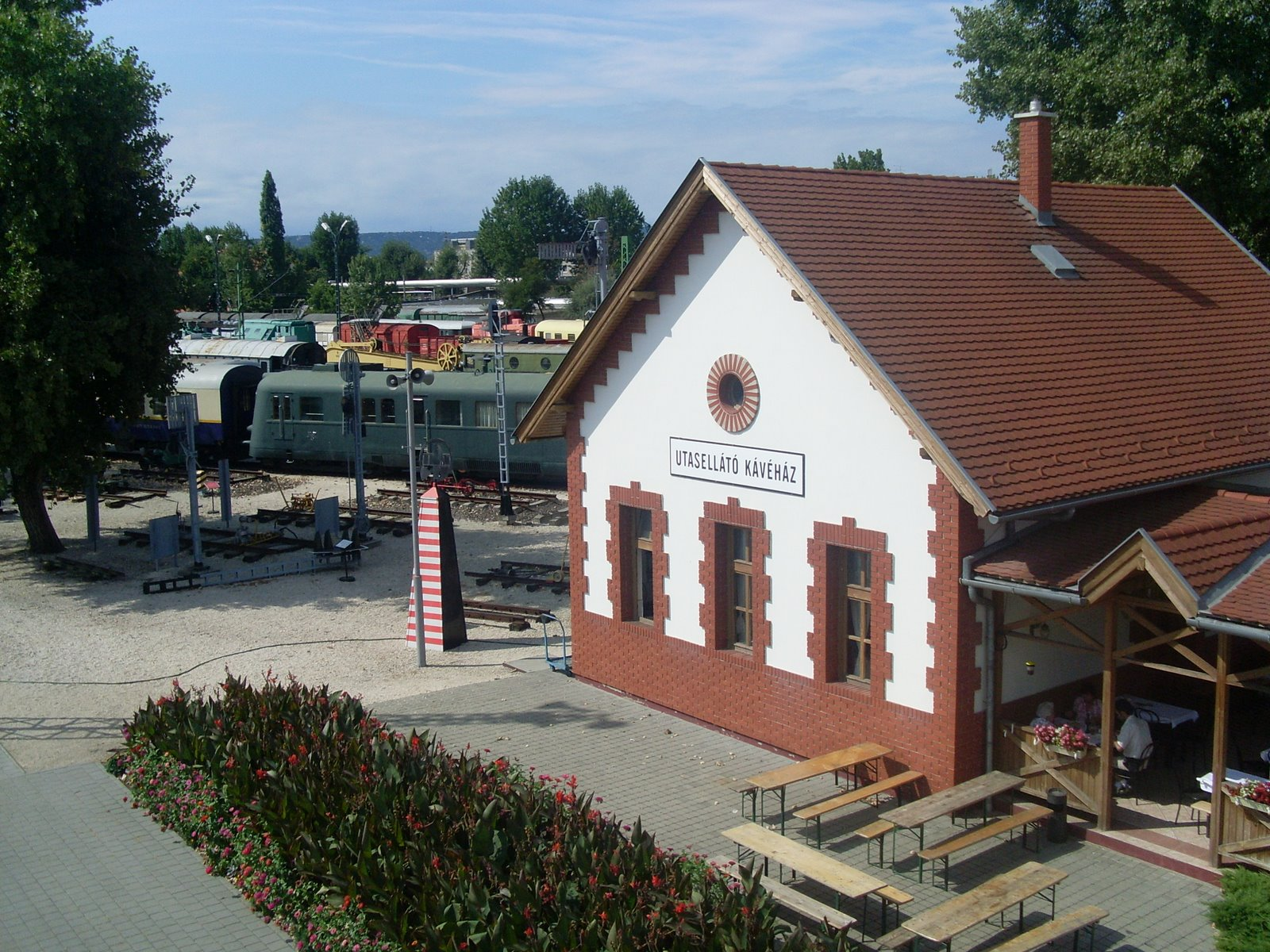
- Established: 2000
- Location: Budapest, Hungary
- Type: Railway museum

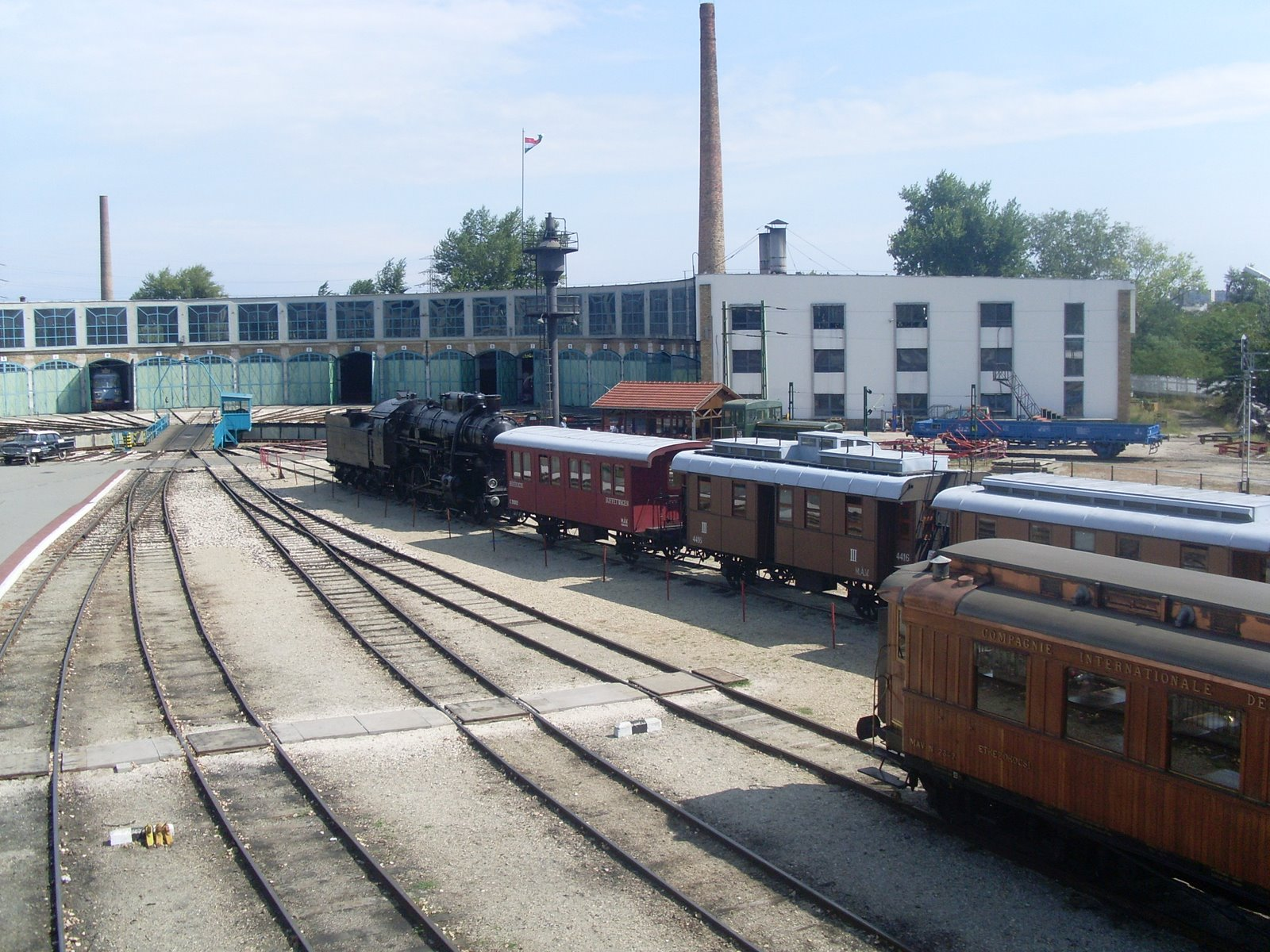

The Magyar Vasúttörténeti Park ("Hungarian Railway History Park") is a railway museum located in Budapest, Hungary at a railway station and workshop of the Hungarian State Railways (MÁV), the former Budapest North Depot. The museum covers more than 70,000 square meters and it features over one hundred exhibits, mostly including railway vehicles and equipment.

== Overview ==
The museum has a fleet with many locomotives of the Hungarian State Railways, ranging from steam engines to electric engines, of which some are still operational. The museum also exhibits other forms of rail transport, such as hand-powered cars and inspection cars. Some exhibits include a teak dining car built for the Orient Express and the Árpád railcar, respectively built in 1912 and 1934.

The museum also has a luxury automobile, a Soviet GAZ-13 Chaika, that has served as an official car of Hungarian Prime Minister Jenő Fock. The car was later converted by the Hungarian State Railways to travel on rails.

The main building of the museum features exhibitions on the history of railway stations, railway equipment and the history of railways in Hungary. Many of the exhibits can be interacted with, such as operating a handcart and experiencing an engine simulator that was originally built for the MÁV V63. There is also a building with model railways. The museum has a ridable miniature railway for children. The museum also features a turntable and a roundhouse with 34 bays.

The operational locomotives are used for nostalgic railway trips in Hungary and abroad.

One of the steam locomotives at the Hungarian Railway Museum is the MÁV 411.118 of the USATC S160 Class.

== History ==
The Hungarian Railway Museum opened its doors on July 14, 2000. The museum is supported by the Hungarian Railway Museum Foundation which was founded on November 22, 1999.

== Gallery ==
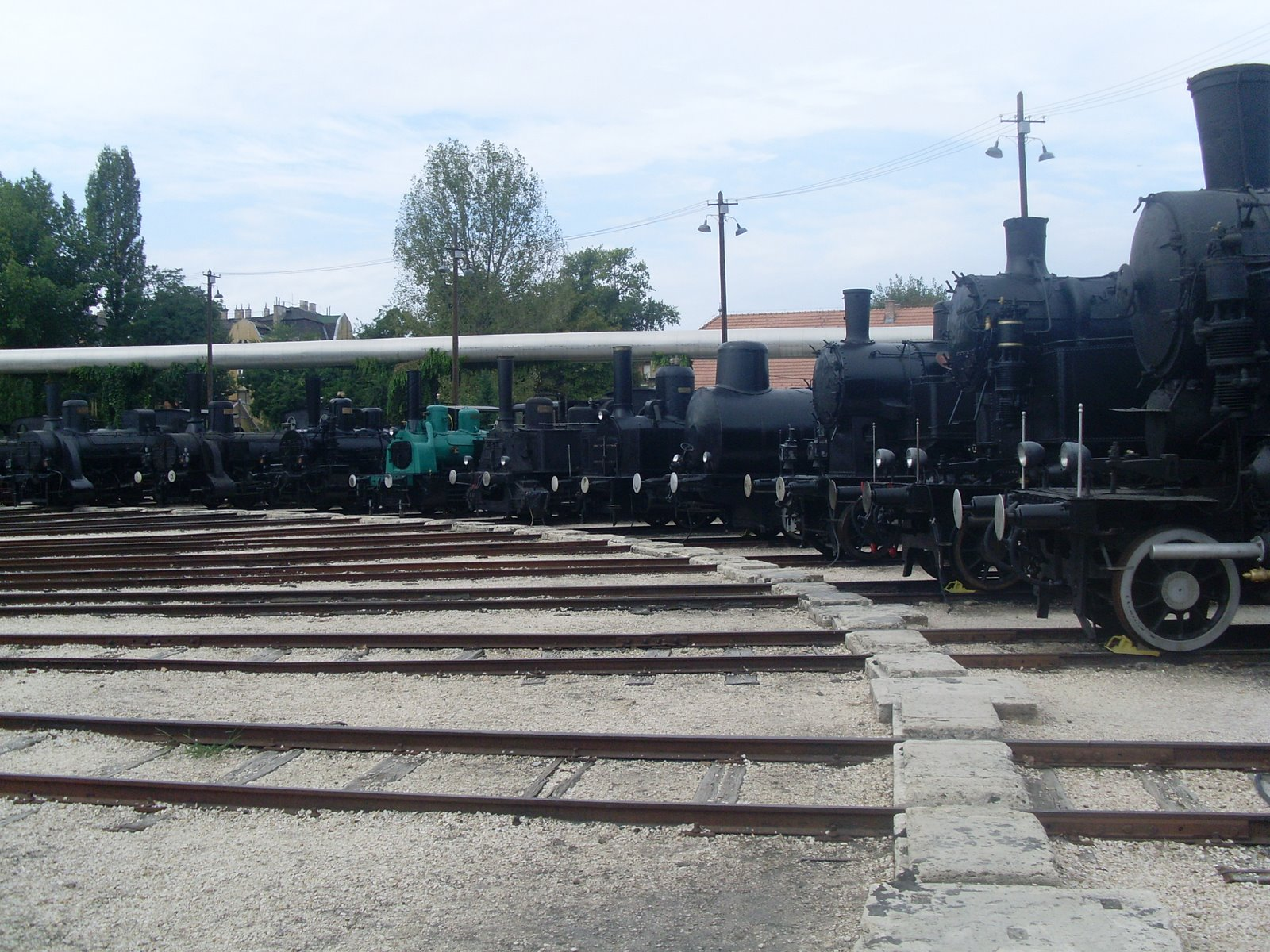
Locomotives

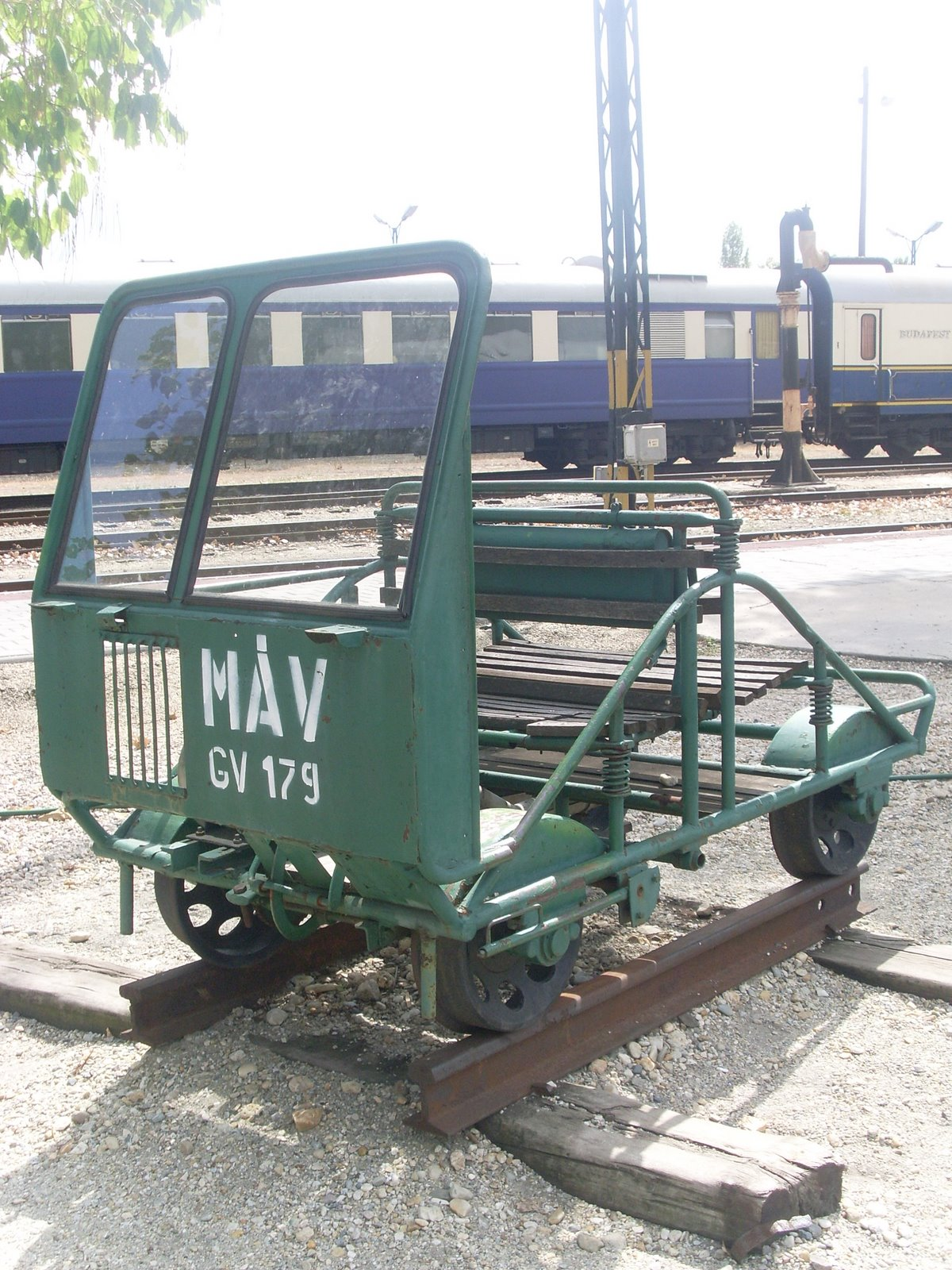

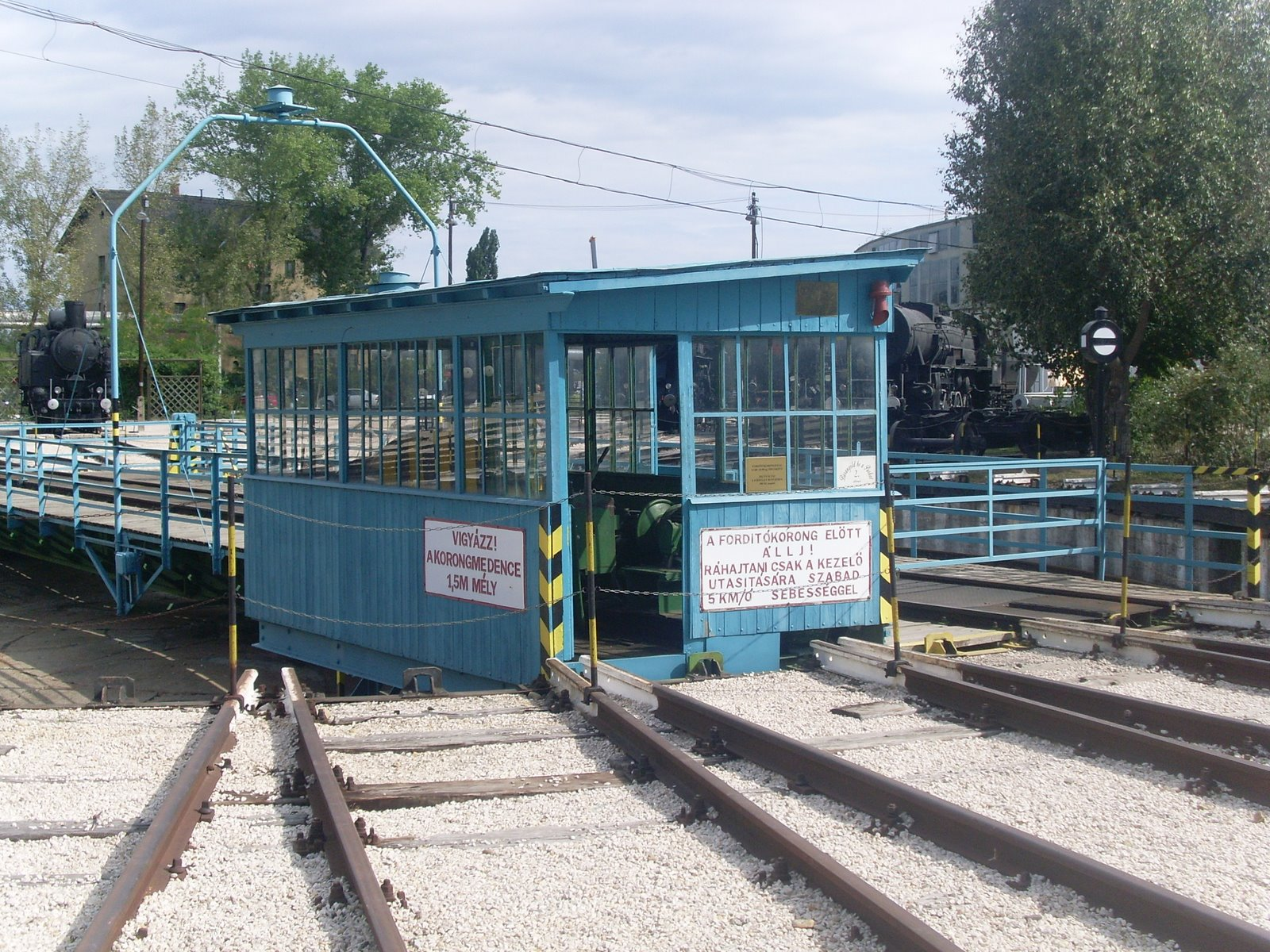
Turntable

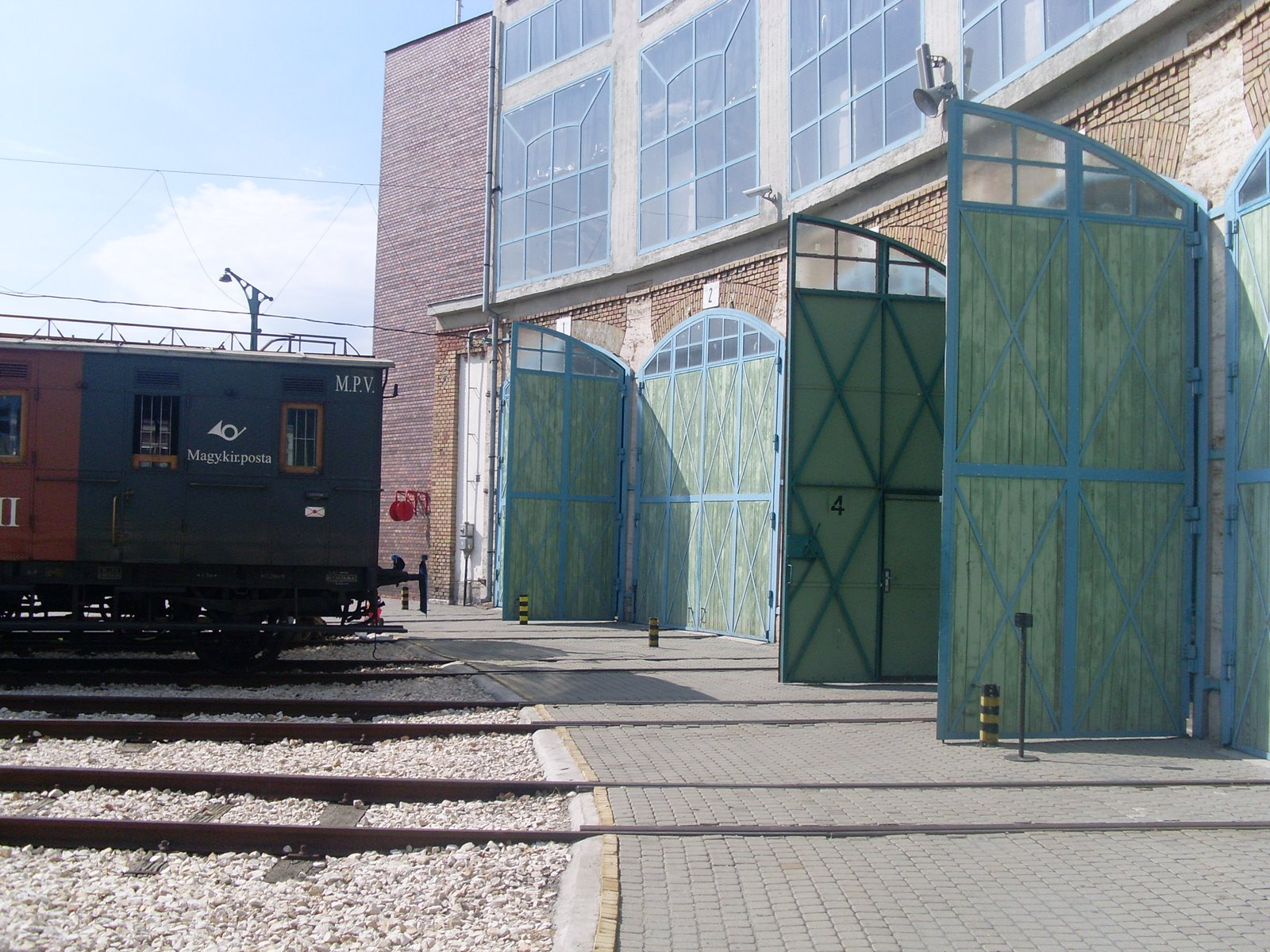
Roundhouse

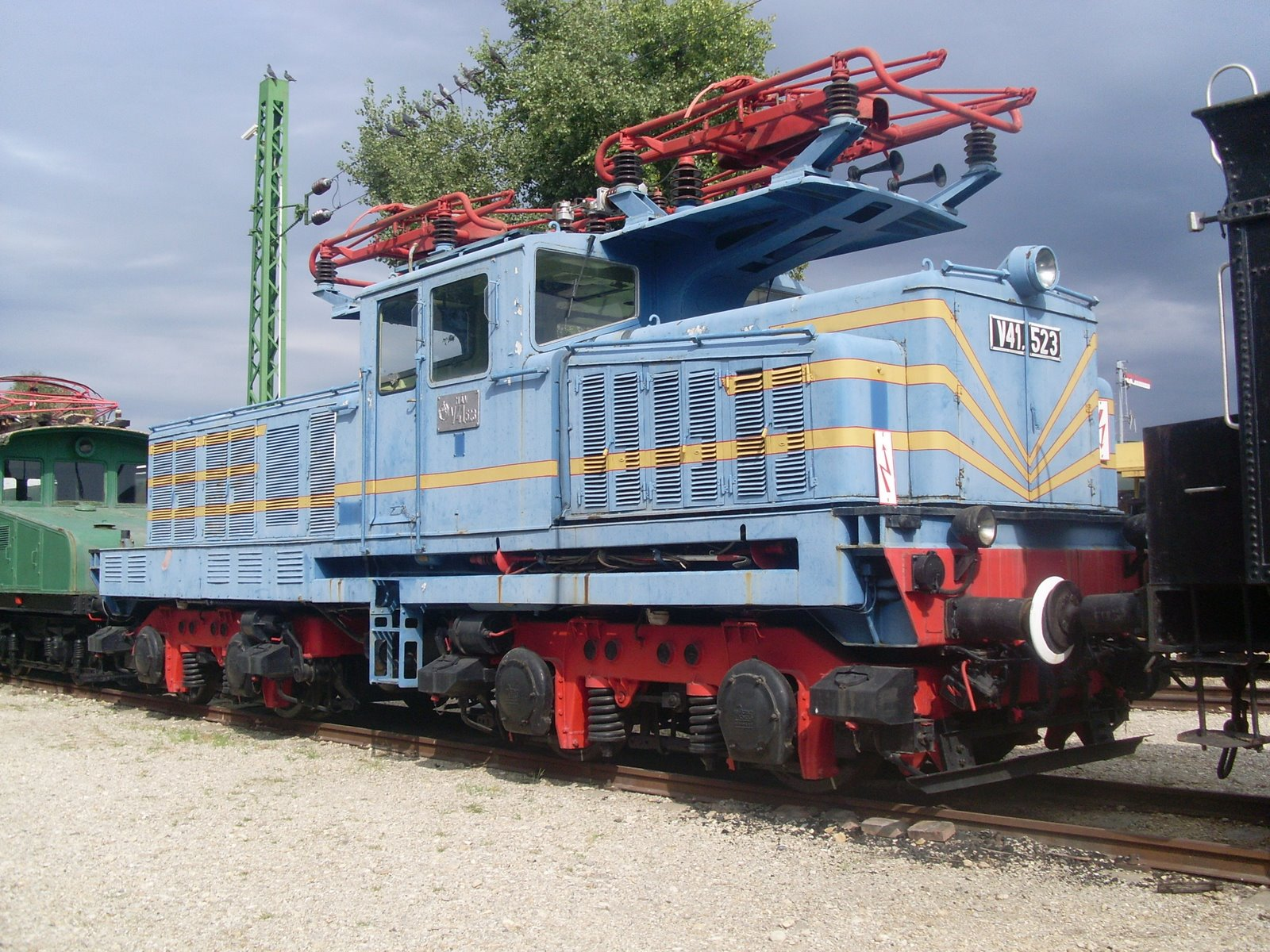
MÁV V41.523

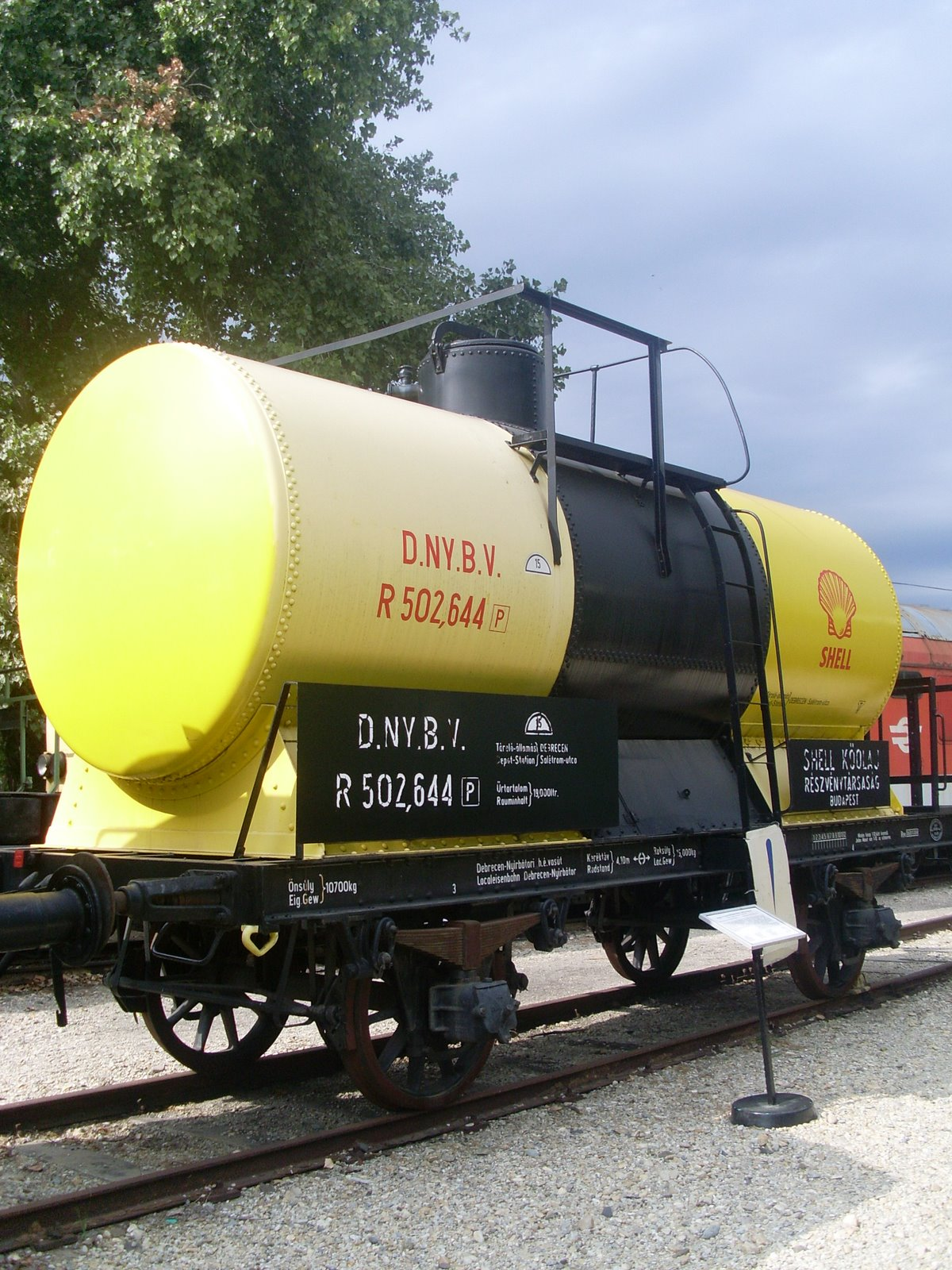

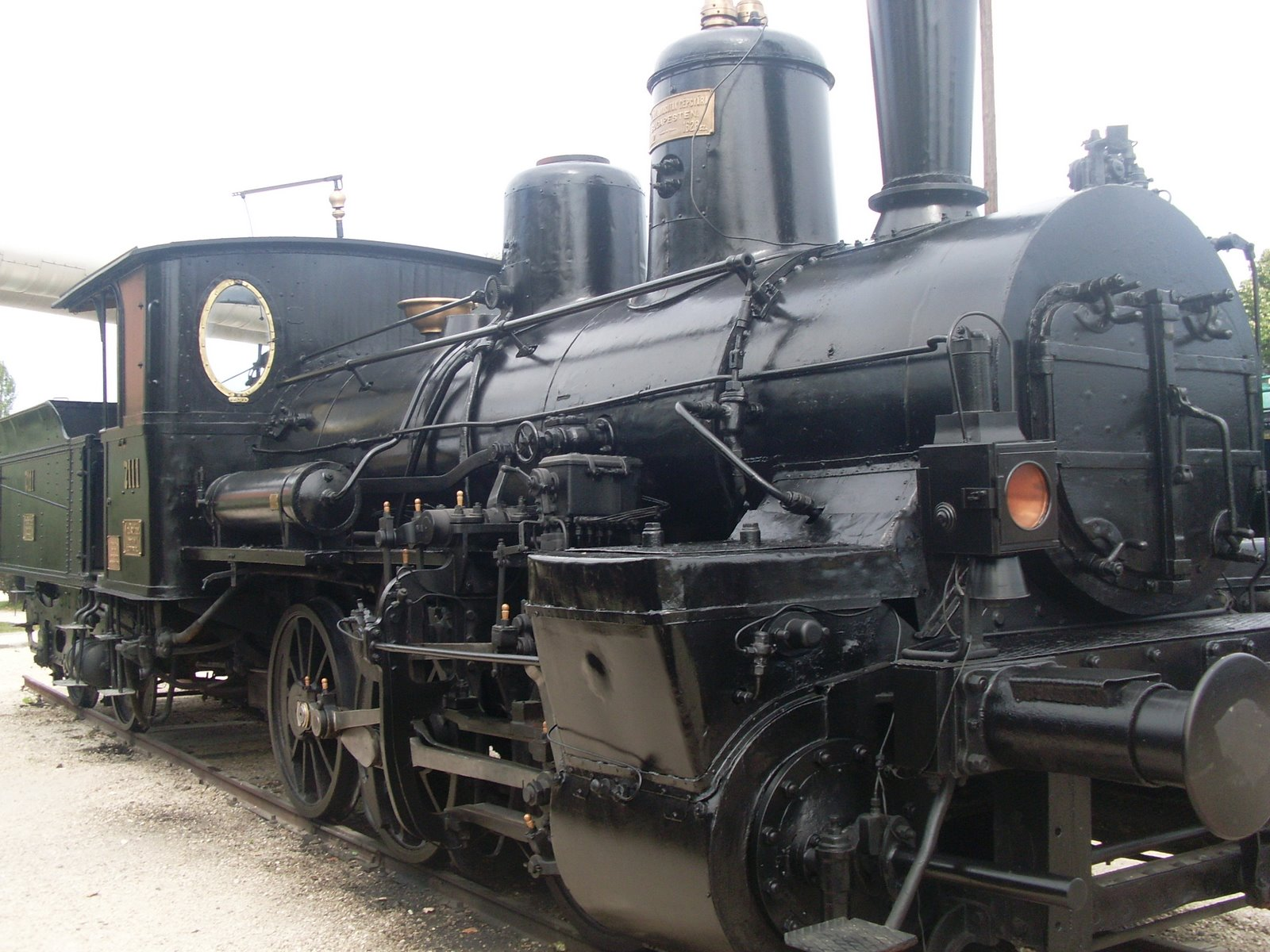

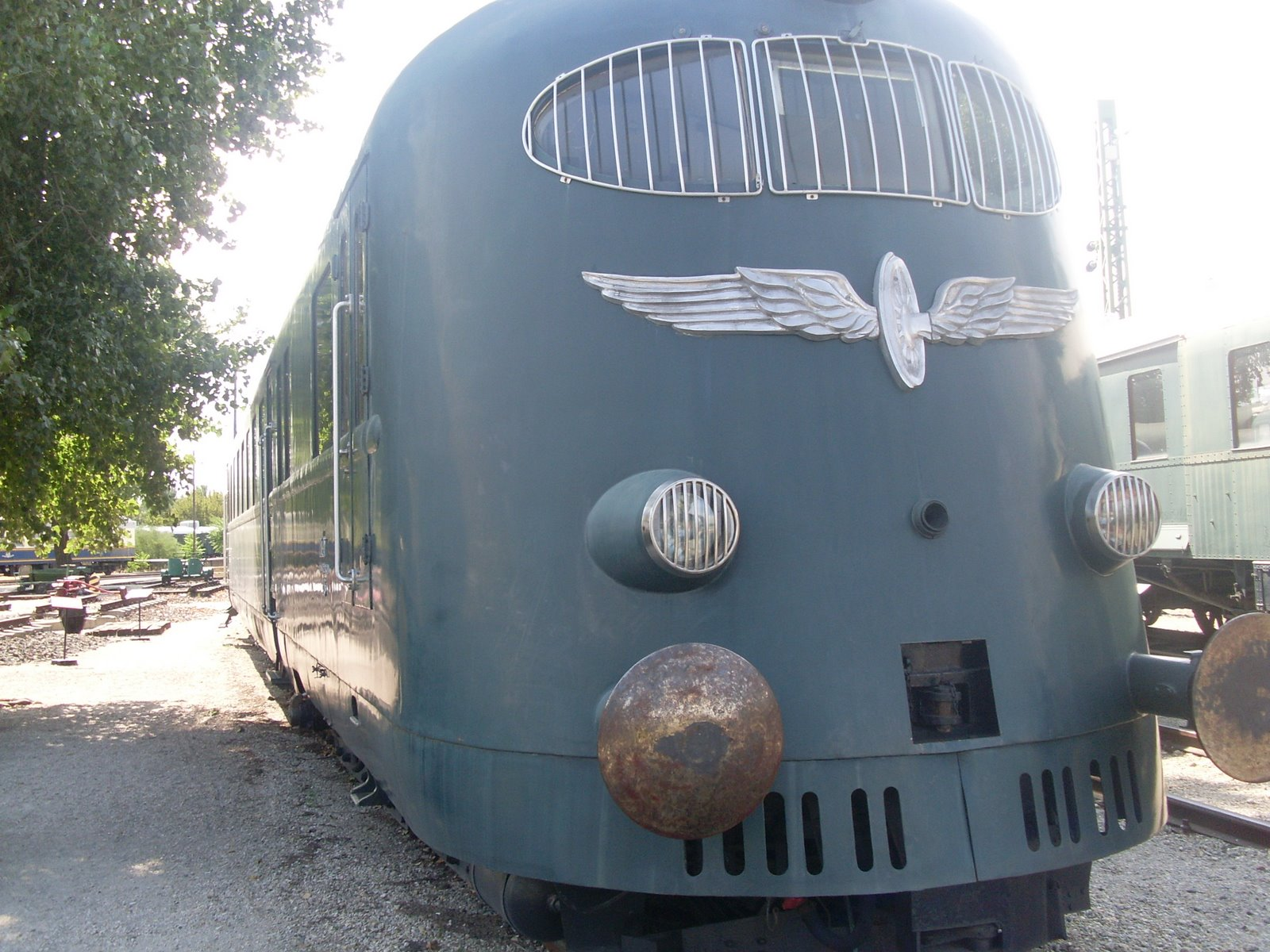

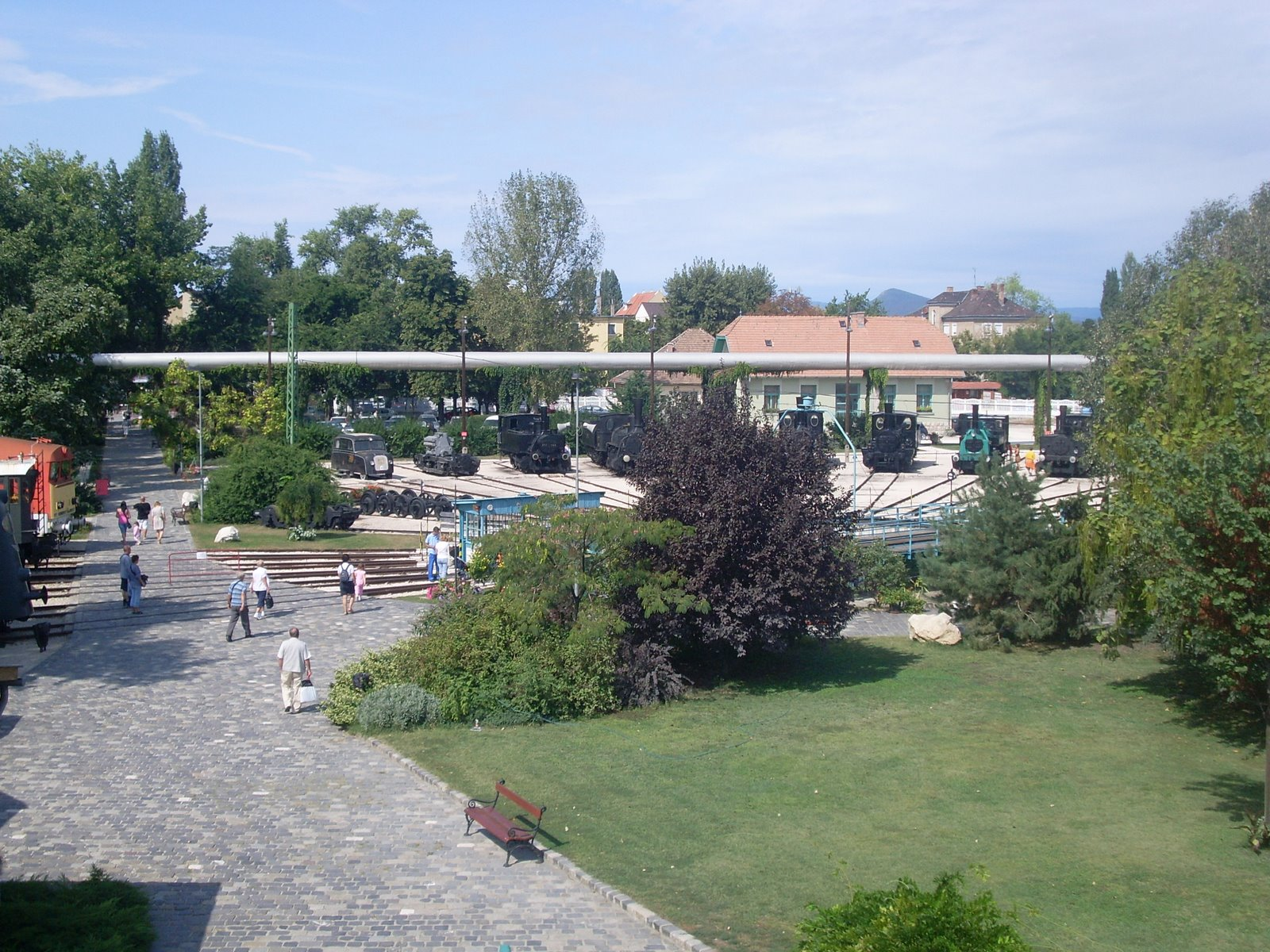
Locomotives and turntable

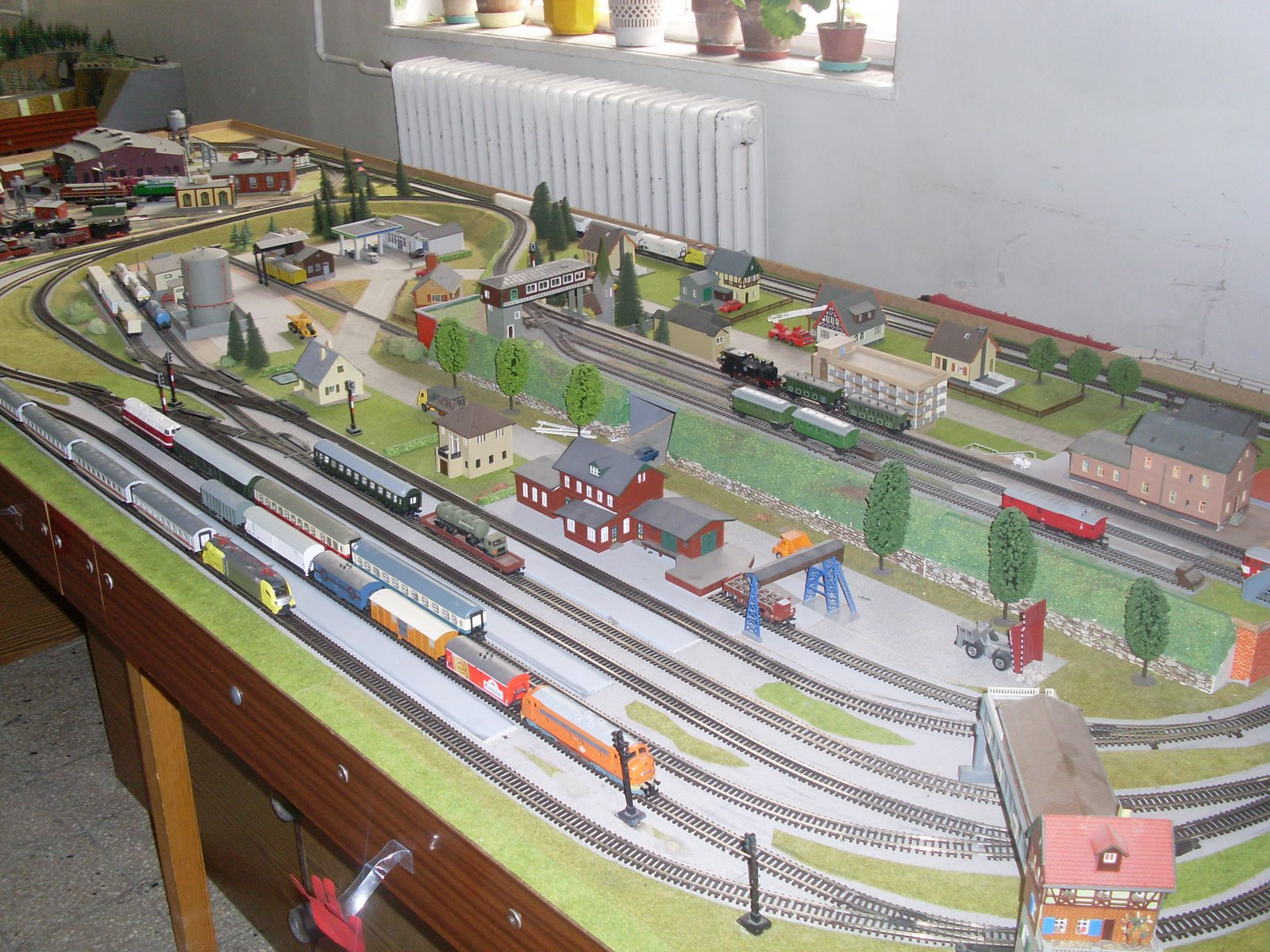
Model railway

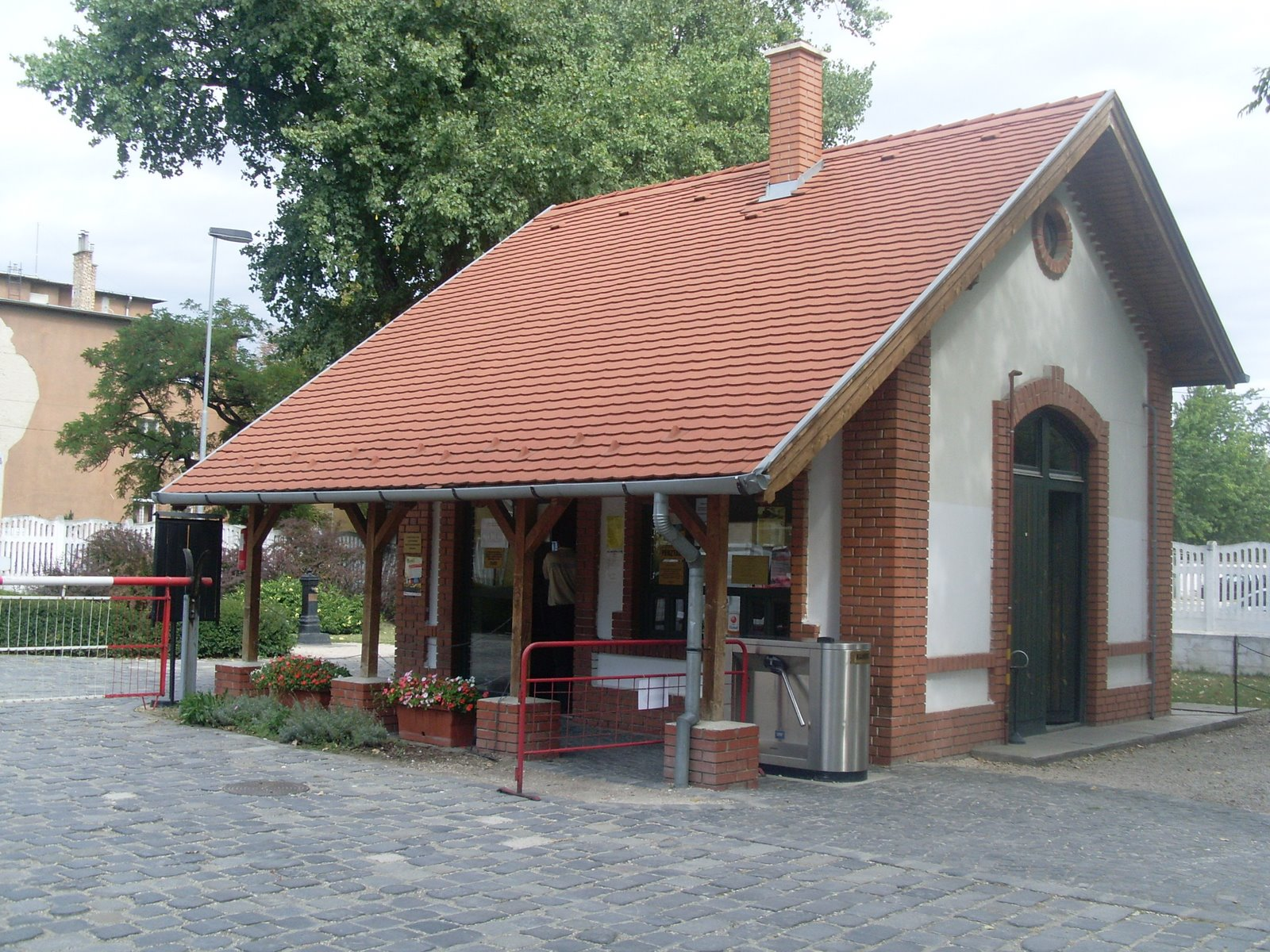

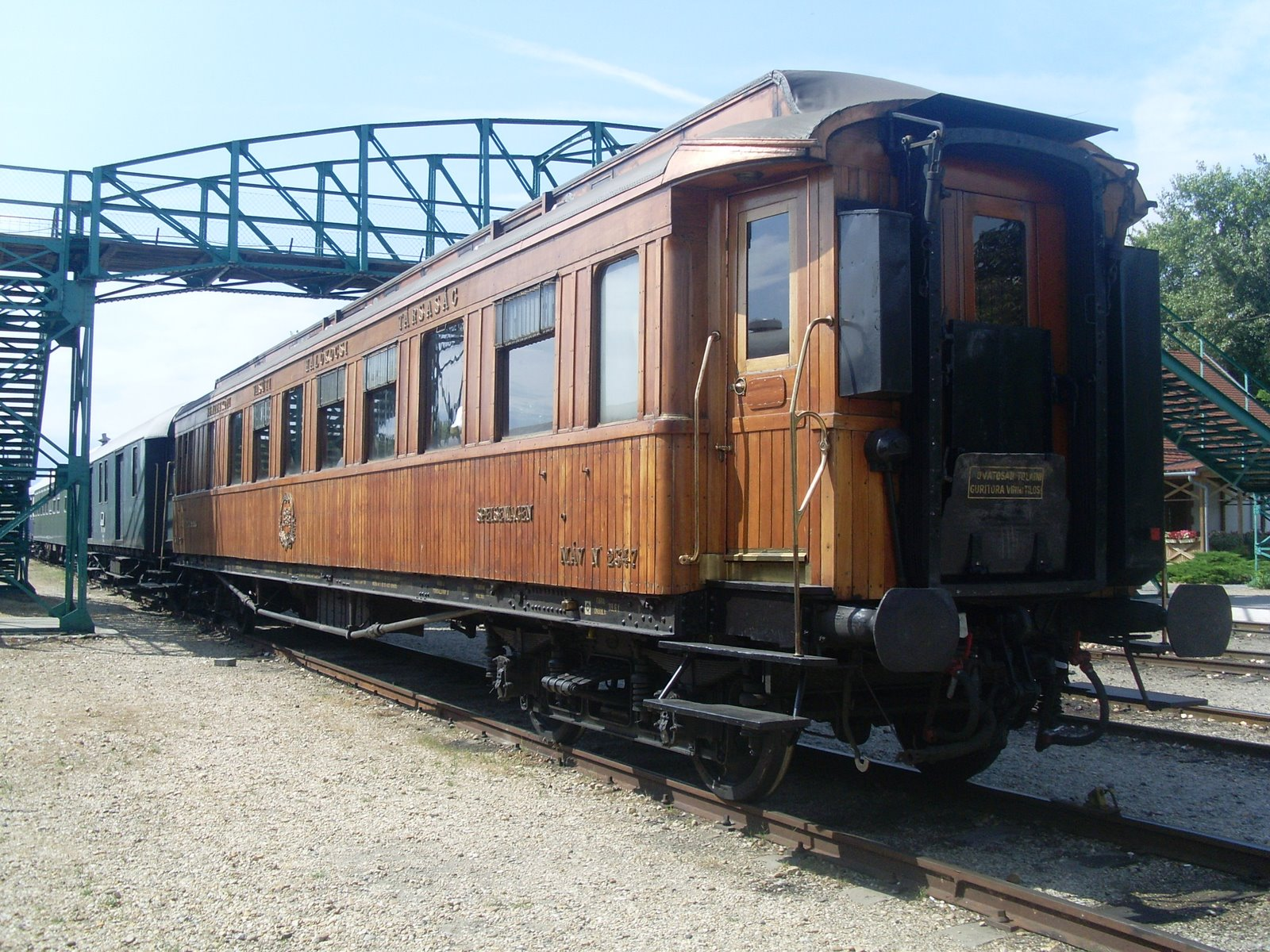

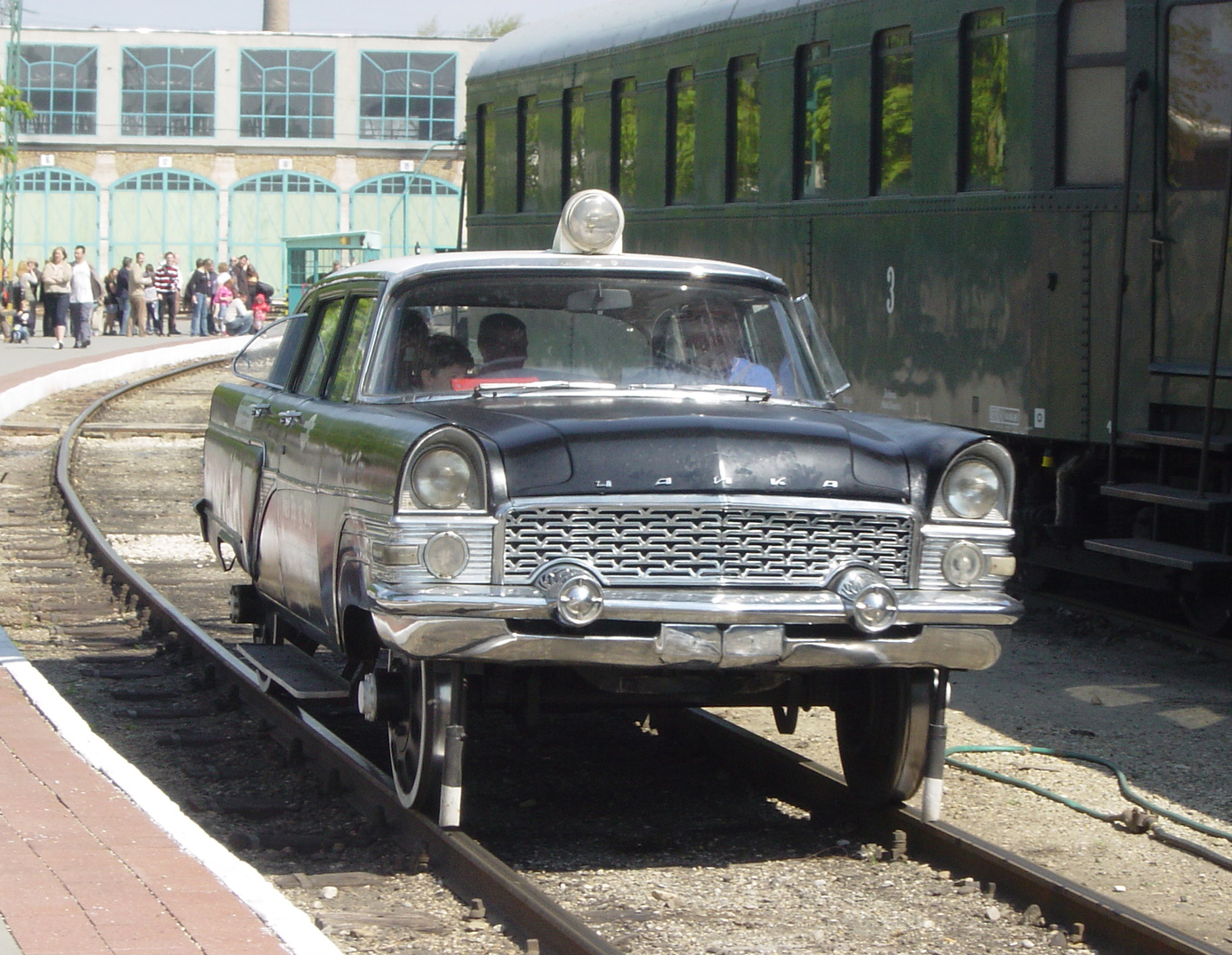
GAZ-13 Chaika

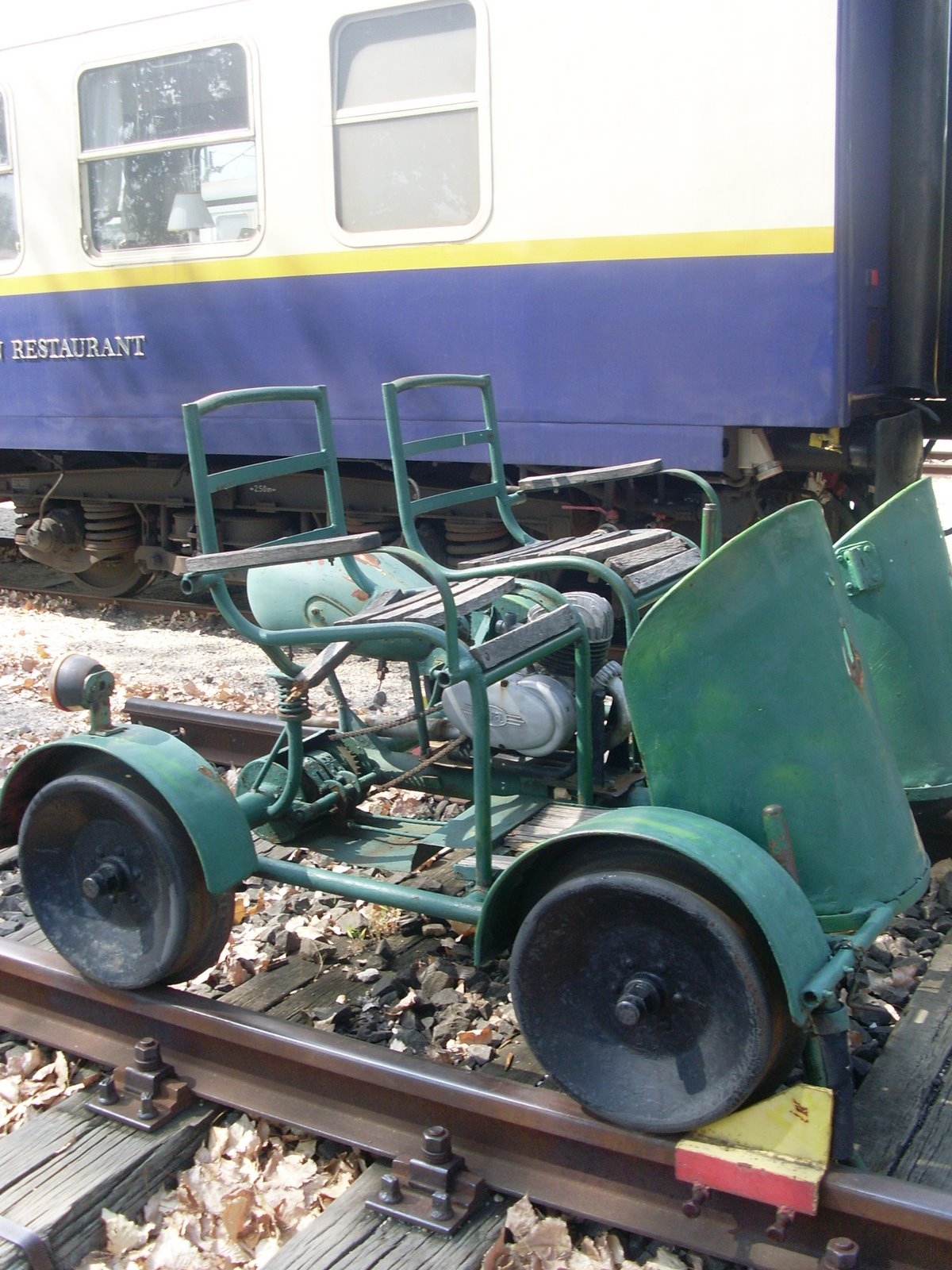
