= FS Class 736 =

FS class 736
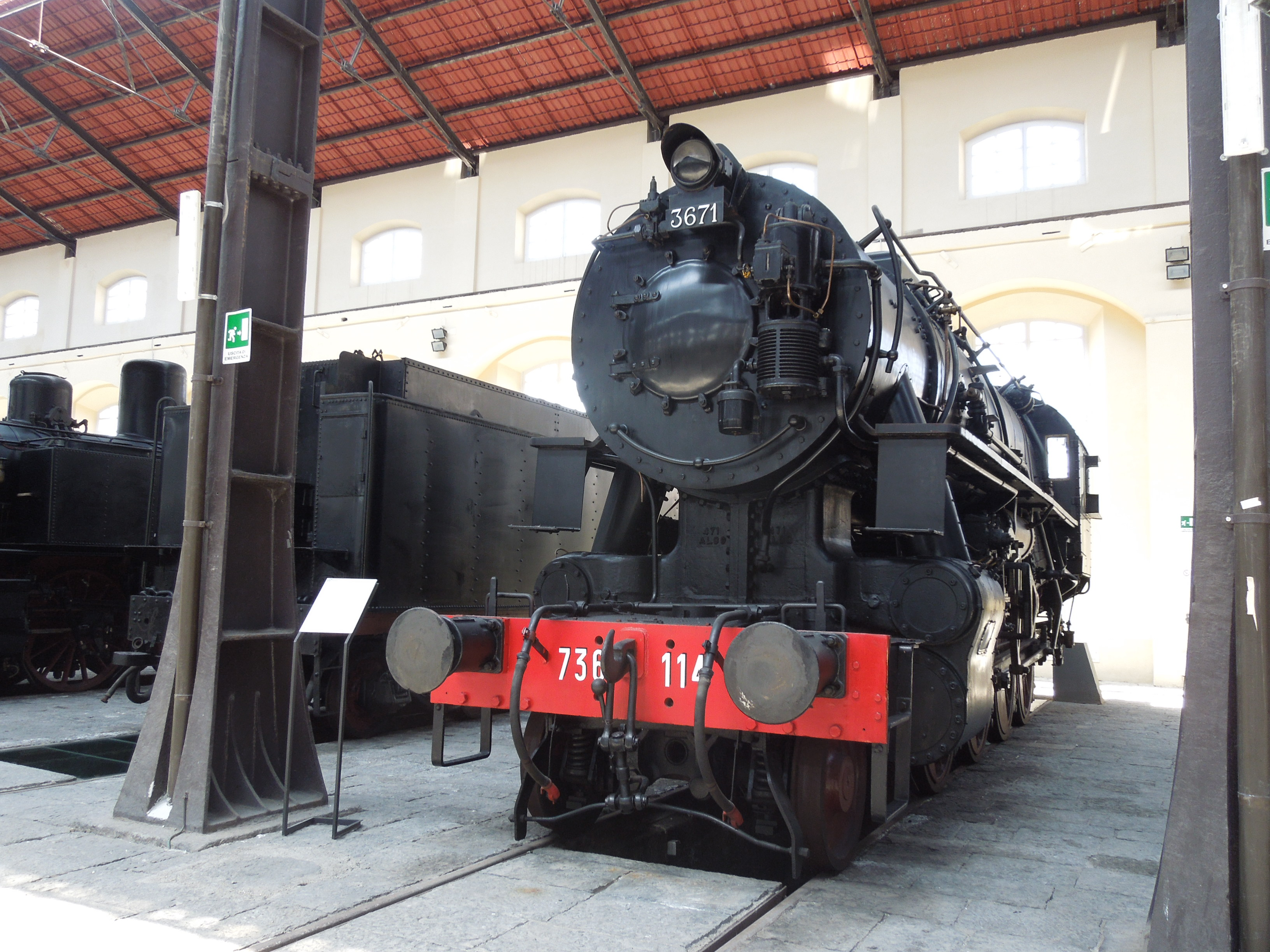
- FS 736.114 on display at the National Railway Museum of Pietrarsa
Type and origin
- Power type: Steam
- Builder: Alco (16); Baldwin (87); Lima (140)
- Model: USATC S160
- Build date: 1942–1945
Specifications
- Configuration
  - Whyte: 2-8-0
  - UIC: 1′D h2
- Gauge: 1,435 mm (4 ft 8 1/2 in)
- Leading dia.: 838 mm (2 ft 9 in)
- Driver dia.: 1,448 mm (4 ft 9 in)
- Wheelbase: 15,742 mm (51 ft 7 3/4 in)
- Length: 18,593 mm (61 ft 0 in), including tender
- Adhesive weight: 63,503 kg (140,000 lb)
- Loco weight: 73,028 kg (161,000 lb)
- Tender weight: 52,390 kg (115,500 lb)
- Total weight: 125,418 kg (276,500 lb)
- Fuel type: Coal
- Fuel capacity: 9,072 kg (20,000 lb)
- Water cap.: 24.6 m^{3} (5,410 imp gal; 6,500 US gal)
- Boiler pressure: Originally: 15.6 kgf/cm^{2} (15.3 bar; 222 psi); Later: 14 kgf/cm^{2} (13.7 bar; 199 psi)
- Cylinders: Two, outside
- Cylinder size: 483 mm × 660 mm (19 in × 26 in)
Career
- Operators: Ferrovie dello Stato
- Numbers: 736.001 – 736.243
- Disposition: Two preserved, four others extant, 25 sold to Greece (3 extant), remainder scrapped

Ferrovie dello Stato (FS; Italian State Railways) Class 736 (Italian: Gruppo 736) was a class of 2-8-0 steam locomotives ex-United States Army Transportation Corps (USATC) 2-8-0 steam locomotives of the S160 Class. There were 243 locomotives in this class, numbered 736.001-243. They were taken to Italy by invading US forces.

They were used on west coast routes working from Rome and Naples, with some later seeing service on the Bologna to Ancona line. Some were transferred to Catania, in Sicily.

In 1959, twenty-five locomotives of this class Nos 736.011/23/40/55/73/90/101/2/126/7/131/5/51/8/60/4/6/78/88/90/9/203/7/9/17 were sold to the Hellenic State Railways (Greek Railways, SEK), to add to their Class Θγ; being renumbered 571–595.
