= MÁV Class 411 =

Hungarian locomotive

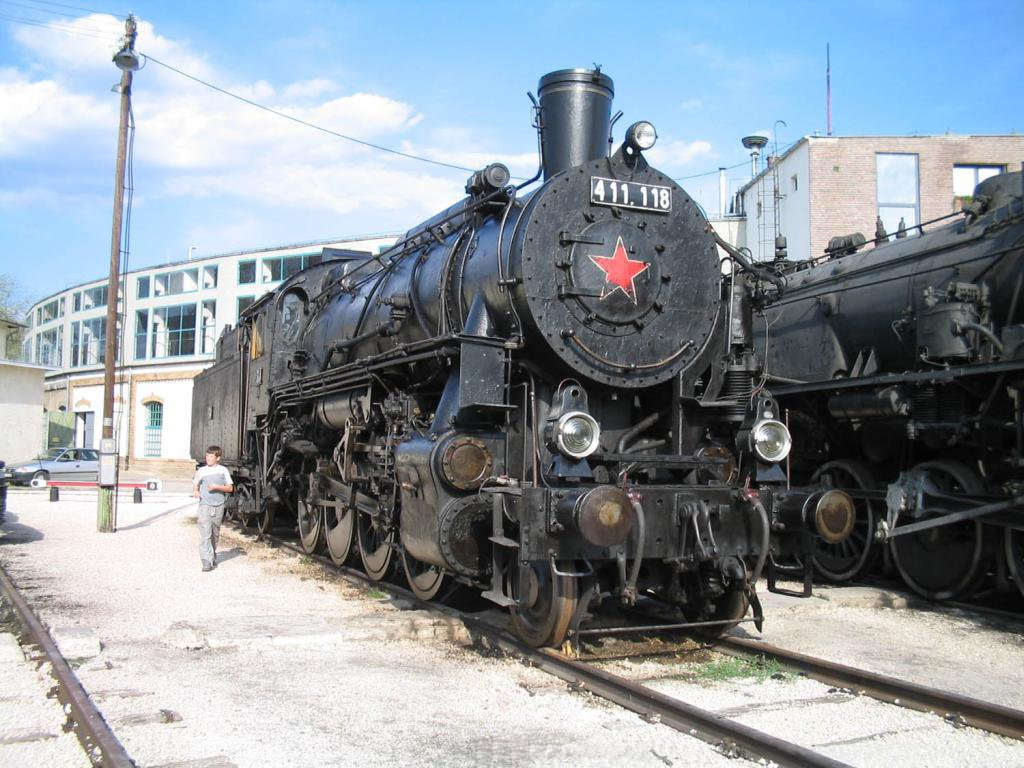
- Preserved MÁV Class 411 number 411.118 in 2003
Type and origin
- Power type: Steam
- Builder: ALCO; Baldwin; Lima
- Build date: 1946–
- Total produced: 510
Specifications
- Configuration
  - Whyte: 2-8-0
- Gauge: 1,435 mm (4 ft 8 1/2 in)
- Driver dia.: 1,448 mm (4 ft 9 in)
- Length: 18.74 m (61 ft 6 in)
- Axle load: 16.0t
- Service weight: 73.5 tonnes (72.3 long tons; 81.0 short tons)
- Fuel type: coal or oil
- Water cap.: 20,605 liters (4,532 imp gal; 5,443 U.S. gal)
- Firebox
  - Grate area: 3.81 m^{2} (41.0 sq ft)
- Heating surface
  - Firebox: 11.89 m^{2} (128.0 sq ft)
  - Tubes: 152.08 m^{2} (1,637.0 sq ft)
  - Total surface: 163.97 m^{2} (1,765.0 sq ft)
- Cylinders: Two, outside
- Cylinder size: 483 mm × 660 mm (19.0 in × 26.0 in)
- Valve gear: Walschaerts
- Loco brake: Air braked
- Train brakes: Air brakes
Performance figures
- Power output: 1,224 hp (913 kW)
- Tractive effort: 142.8 kN (32,100 lbf)
Career
- Nicknames: Trumans
- First run: 1947
- Withdrawn: 1965–1980
- Preserved: 411.118, 411.144, 411.264, 411.358, 411.388, 411.380 and 411.337 as parts sources, others of base S160 class
- Disposition: Most scrapped, 5 preserved, 2 retained as parts sources

The MÁV Class 411 was a class of steam locomotives used by Hungarian railways.

== History ==
After World War II, Hungary, like many of the war-torn European countries, suffered a severe shortage of motive power, with much of the MÁV stock either damaged, destroyed, or confiscated by German forces to replace their damaged equipment. The US Government offered Hungary a $150 million commodity loan and a part of this was used to purchase 510 pieces of the USATC S160 Class steam locomotives, for $10,000 each. The negotiations started in 1946, with the first engines arriving in May 1947. The origins of the Hungarian S160s were:

- ALCO - 159 pc
- Baldwin - 148 pc
- Lima - 203 pc

In their delivery state 425 locomotives were set up as coal burners while 85 engines were oil burners, the engines could easily be converted from one fuel to the other as needed.

The locomotives were classified due to their four driven axles and an axle load higher than 14.3 metric tons as MÁV Class 411. The Hungarian series numbering followed neither the manufacturer's name or number, nor the production date, but the arrival date in Hungary. The poorest quality 28 engines got no MÁV numbers, these were preserved as component sources for later repairs. MÁV immediately performed tests to find out load characteristics, loading and braking tables were created. By January 1948, 405 locomotives were already prepared for service.

== Modifications ==
Unlike many other European users of the S160 locomotives MÁV considered these engines as a medium-term solution and decided to change many details on them. These changes were performed during a longer period, up to the 1960s. The most important and well visible changes were the following ones:

- Lifting the cab roof height by 30 cm by welding a horizontal steel strip into cab side and front. This was necessary as the Class S160 engines were designed to negotiate the low British clearances and were very low-pitched for usual personnel.
- Replacing the square front windows and the left side front door by standard oval windows.
- Adding a protection cover for the turret on the longboiler top in front of the cab.
- Moving the air pump from the smokebox front to the smokebox left side.
- Increasing the stack height
- Replacing the steam engine brake with an air brake
- Adding train heating hose and coupling
- Lifting the tender coal bunker bottom height
- Replacing the American whistle with a MÁV standard one

Class 411 locomotives hauled mainly medium size freight trains, as well as occasional passenger trains. They were considered as reliable and handsome engines with considerable reserves.

== Withdrawal ==
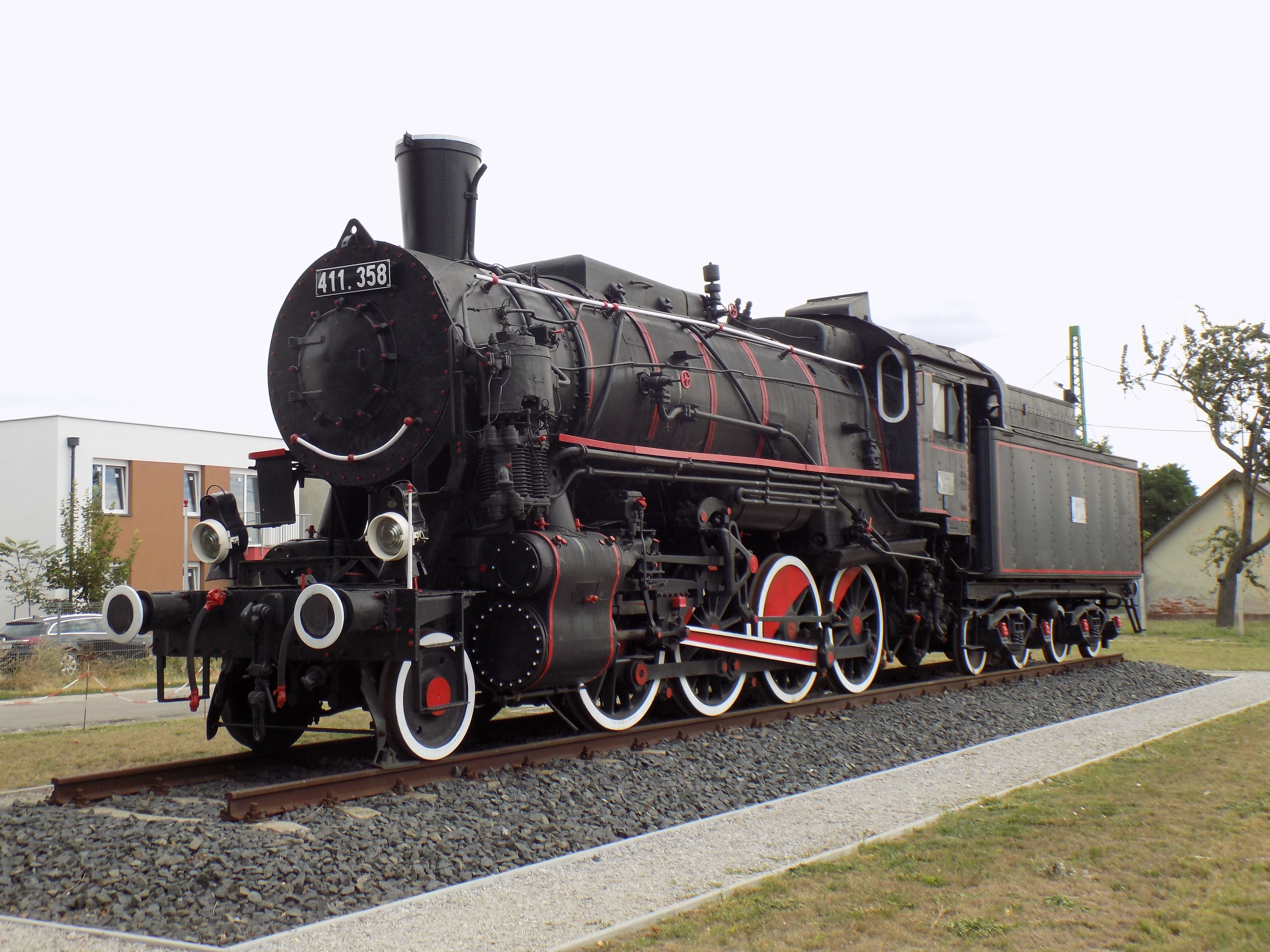
411,358 at Hegyeshalom station

Their withdrawal started in 1965 and continued by scrapping 15-30 locomotives every year. In 1980 only 6 pieces remained; they were withdrawn in the following three years. According to preservation lists, three Class 411 machines are preserved in Hungary:

- 411,118 - Hungarian Railway Museum, Budapest, operational
- 411,264 - Hatvan RR. station, plinthed
- 411,358 - Hegyeshalom station, plinthed

The 411,144 was originally intended to be preserved with the Hungarian National Collection, but was mistakenly sent to be scrapped. Fortunately, the 411,144 was purchased in 1992 by Martin Haines for the Milton-Keynes Locomotion & Navigation (GB), and is now preserved at the Churnet Valley Railway, along with another S160 from China. 411,388 was sold to the East Lancashire Railway in the same year, and is currently undergoing an overhaul at the Nottingham Transport Heritage Centre. The center also has received the remains of 411,380 and 411,337, which will be used as parts sources for 411,388. The boiler of 411.005 remains in Hungary.
