= SEK Class Theta-gamma =

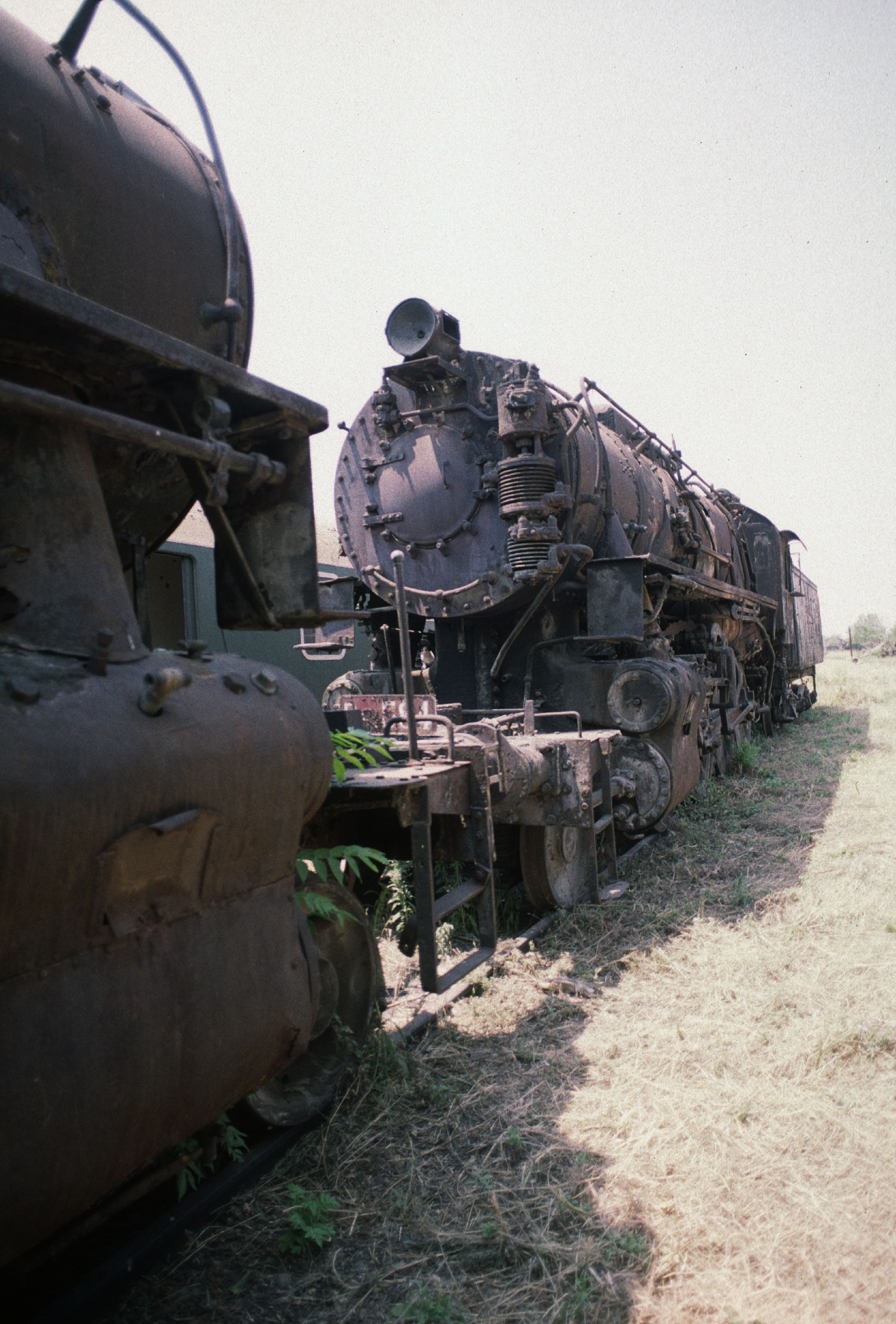
Type and origin
- Builder: ALCO; Baldwin Locomotive Works; Lima Locomotive Works
Specifications
- Configuration
  - Whyte: 2-8-0
  - UIC: 1′D h2

SEK (Sidirodromoi Ellinikou Kratous, Hellenic State Railways) Class Θγ (or Class Thg; Theta-gamma) was a class of 2-8-0 steam locomotives ex-United States Army Transportation Corps S160 type. 27 locomotives were acquired in 1947; Θγ521–537 were coal burners, while Θγ551–560 were oil burners. In 1959, Italian Railways (Ferrovie dello Stato, FS) sold another 25, formerly Class 736, Nos 736.011/23/40/55/73/90/101/2/126/7/131/5/51/8/60/4/6/78/88/90/9/203/7/9/17 to SEK. These were renumbered Θγ571-95 in the same order.

== Stock list ==
SEK stock list
SEK No.	Former USATC No.	Former FS No.	Builder	Date Built	Works No.
Θγ521	2050	-	ALCo	1943	70532
Θγ522	2112	-	ALCo	1943	70594
Θγ523	2127	-	ALCo	1943	70609
Θγ524	2154	-	Lima	1943	8160
Θγ525	2206	-	Lima	1943	8212
Θγ526	2428	-	ALCo	1943	70777
Θγ527	2443	-	ALCo	1943	70792
Θγ528	2229	-	Lima	1943	8235
Θγ529	2456	-	ALCo	1943	70805
Θγ530	2573	-	Lima	1943	8275
Θγ531	3398	-	Baldwin	1944	70355
Θγ532	3524	-	Baldwin	1944	70481
Θγ533	1781	-	Baldwin	1942	67615
Θγ534	2166	-	Lima	1943	8172
Θγ535	2226	-	Lima	1943	8232
Θγ536	2365	-	Baldwin	1943	69622
Θγ537	2537	-	Lima	1943	8354
Θγ551	3338	-	ALCo	1944	71593
Θγ552	3352	-	ALCo	1944	71607
Θγ553	3364	-	ALCo	1944	71619
Θγ554	3374	-	ALCo	1944	71629
Θγ555	3375	-	ALCo	1944	71630
Θγ556	3327	-	ALCo	1944	71582
Θγ557	3347	-	ALCo	1944	71602
Θγ558	3357	-	ALCo	1944	71612
Θγ559	3360	-	ALCo	1944	71615
Θγ560	3372	-	ALCo	1944	71627
Θγ571	1740	736.011	Baldwin	1942	67574
Θγ572	1785	736.023	Baldwin	1942	67619
Θγ573	2070	736.040	ALCo	1943	70552
Θγ574	2746	736.055	Baldwin	1943	70009
Θγ575	3278	736.073	ALCo	1944	71533
Θγ576	3299	736.090	ALCo	1944	71554
Θγ577	3310	736.101	ALCo	1944	71565
Θγ578	3311	736.102	ALCo	1944	71566
Θγ579	3348	736.126	ALCo	1944	71603
Θγ580	3350	736.127	ALCo	1944	71605
Θγ581	3383	736.131	Baldwin	1944	70340
Θγ582	3387	736.135	Baldwin	1944	70344
Θγ583	3413	736.151	Baldwin	1944	70370
Θγ584	3420	736.158	Baldwin	1944	70377
Θγ585	3422	736.160	Baldwin	1944	70379
Θγ586	3426	736.164	Baldwin	1944	70383
Θγ587	3428	736.166	Baldwin	1944	70385
Θγ588	3622	736.178	Lima	1944	8535
Θγ589	3666	736.188	Lima	1944	8579
Θγ590	3668	736.190	Lima	1944	8581
Θγ591	3690	736.199	Lima	1944	8603
Θγ592	3694	736.203	Lima	1944	8607
Θγ593	3698	736.207	Lima	1944	8611
Θγ594	4418	736.209	ALCo	1945	73410
Θγ595	5740	736.217	Lima	1944	8678

A few still survive in scrapyard condition. Four are at Thessaloniki Old Depot (Θγ 525, 532, 535, 584), one is outside Thessaloniki current depot (Θγ 593) whilst one more survives at Tithorea depot (Θγ 576). Θγ 575 is under overhaul at the Churnet Valley Railway in Great Britain.

== See also ==
- USATC S160 Class
