= USATC S160 Class =

Class of American 2-8-0 locomotive built for service overseas during World War II

USATC S160 Class China KD6, ÖBB Class 956, ČSD Class 456.1, SNCF Class 140U, SEK Class Θγ (THg), MÁV Class 411, FS Class 736, PKP Tr201 and Tr203, Russia class Ш^{A}, Renfe class 553, TCDD 45171 Class, JŽ class 37, KSR 8000 series, KNR Sori2 class, SNCB/NMBS type 281
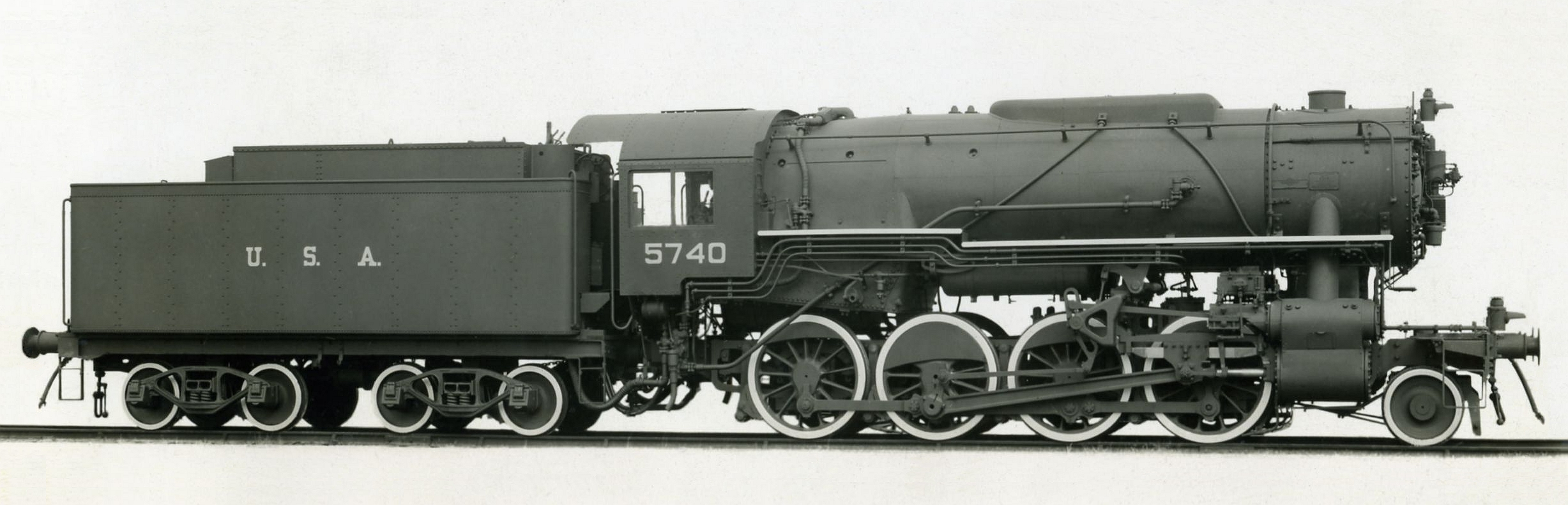
- Lima Locomotive Works builder portrait of USATC number 5740
Type and origin
- Power type: Steam
- Designer: Major J. W. Marsh
- Builder: American Locomotive Company (755), Baldwin Locomotive Works (712), Lima Locomotive Works (653)
- Build date: 1942–1945
- Total produced: 2,120
Specifications
- Configuration
  - Whyte: 2-8-0
  - UIC: 1′D h2
- Gauge: 1,435 mm (4 ft 8 1/2 in); 1,520 mm (4 ft 11 27/32 in) Russian Railways; 1,668 mm (5 ft 5 21/32 in) Renfe Operadora; 1,676 mm (5 ft 6 in); Indian Railways
- Leading dia.: 2 ft 9 in (838 mm)
- Driver dia.: 4 ft 9 in (1,448 mm)
- Wheelbase: 51 ft 7 3/4 in (15.74 m)
- Length: 61 ft 0 in (18.59 m), including tender
- Adhesive weight: 140,000 lb (63,503 kg)
- Loco weight: 161,000 lb (73,028 kg)
- Tender weight: 115,500 lb (52,390 kg)
- Total weight: 276,500 lb (125,418 kg)
- Fuel type: Coal
- Fuel capacity: 20,000 lb (9,072 kg)
- Water cap.: 6,500 US gal (25,000 L; 5,400 imp gal)
- Firebox
  - Grate area: 41 sq ft (3.8 m^{2})
- Boiler: 5 ft 10 in (1.78 m) maximum diameter
- Boiler pressure: 225 lbf/in^{2} (1.55 MPa)
- Heating surface
  - Firebox: 136 sq ft (12.6 m^{2})
  - Tubes: 1,055 sq ft (98.0 m^{2}) (150 in or 3,810 mm long × 2 in or 51 mm diameter)
  - Flues: 567 sq ft (52.7 m^{2}) (30 in or 762 mm long × 5.375 in or 137 mm diameter)
  - Total surface: 2,253 sq ft (209.3 m^{2})
- Superheater
  - Heating area: 313 sq ft (29.1 m^{2})
- Cylinders: Two, outside
- Cylinder size: 19 in × 26 in (482.6 mm × 660.4 mm) bore x stroke
- Valve gear: Walschaerts
- Valve type: 10 inches (254 mm) piston valves
Performance figures
- Tractive effort: 31,492 lbf (140.1 kN)
- Factor of adh.: 4.45
Career
- Class: USATC S160 and country derivatives
- Official name: USATC S160 Class
- Locale: United States; Europe; China; Korea
- Disposition: At least 33 known preserved, possibly more in derelict condition, remainder scrapped

The United States Army Transportation Corps S160 Class is a class of 2-8-0 "Consolidation" type steam locomotives, designed for heavy freight work in Europe during World War II. A total of 2,120 were built and they worked on railroads across much of the world, including Africa, Asia, all of Europe and South America.

== Design ==
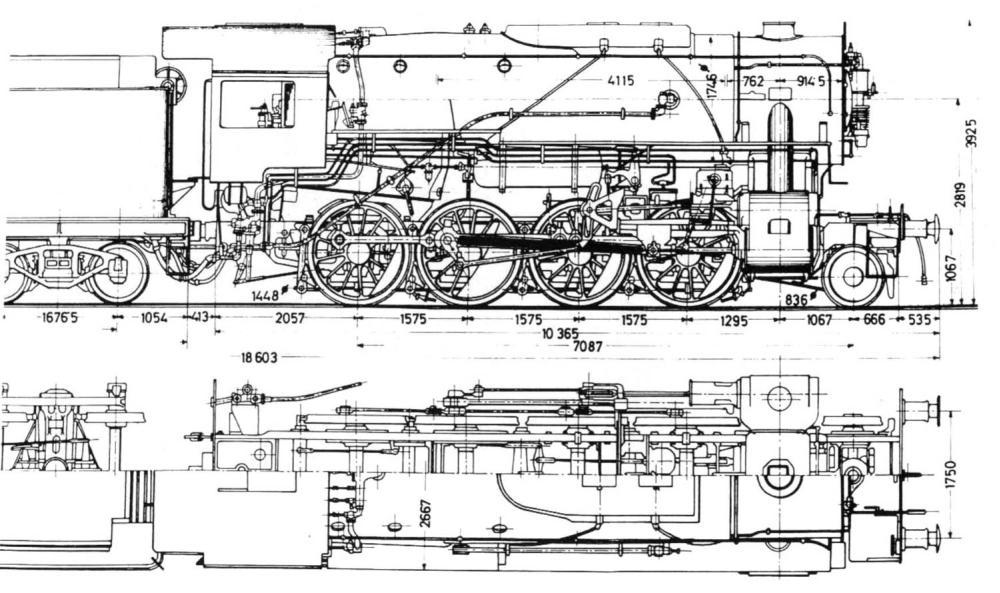
S160 drawing.

During the 1930s, the United States Army Transportation Corps approved an update of a Baldwin Locomotive Works World War I design, to be used, if required, for war transportation. The result was the S159 Class loco. During the early period of World War II, when America was neutral, the government of Franklin D. Roosevelt approved the Lend-Lease supply to the United Kingdom of the S200 Class, a 2-8-2 configuration, designed specifically to fit into the restricted British loading gauge.

With America's entry to World War II, the USATC needed a developed design from which a large number of locomotives could be constructed to run on the wrecked railways of Europe, deploying military hardware and civilian goods. Hence, the development of the S160 Class, designed by Maj. J. W. Marsh from the Railway Branch of the Corps of Engineers, which drew on previous locomotives, using austerity principles, and was built using methods which allowed for efficient and fast construction, and a long life, including axlebox grease lubricators, and rolled plates in preference to castings.

With cast frames (a few had frames which were flame-cut from rolled steel slabs) and cast wheels, the front two driving axles were sprung independently from the rear two driving axles, to cater for running on poor-quality track. The larger tender layout was derived from the similar design of the British WD Austerity 2-8-0, with an inset coal bunker above the water tank to improve visibility when running backwards.

== Construction ==
Builders	Construction numbers	Years	Quantity	USATC numbers
American Locomotive Company	70431 – 70455	1942	25	1600 – 1624
American Locomotive Company	70278 – 70302	1942	25	1625 – 1649
American Locomotive Company	70457 – 70483	1942	27	1650 – 1676
Baldwin Locomotive Works	67661 – 67685	1943	25	1677 – 1701
Baldwin Locomotive Works	64641 – 64665	1942	25	1702 – 1726
Baldwin Locomotive Works	67561 – 67660	1942	100	1727 – 1826
Lima Locomotive Works	8058 – 8101	1942	44	1827 – 1870
Lima Locomotive Works	8102 – 8157	1943	56	1871 – 1926
American Locomotive Company	70514 – 70531	1942	18	2032 – 2049
American Locomotive Company	70532 – 70540	1942	9	2050 – 2058
American Locomotive Company	70541 – 70633	1943	93	2059 – 2151
Lima Locomotive Works	8158 – 8247	1943	90	2152 – 2241
Baldwin Locomotive Works	69485 – 69574	1943	90	2242 – 2331
Baldwin Locomotive Works	69589 – 69639	1943	51	2332 – 2382
American Locomotive Company	70749 – 70808	1943	60	2400 – 2459
Lima Locomotive Works	8317 – 8376	1943	60	2500 – 2559
Lima Locomotive Works	8262 – 8291	1943	30	2560 – 2589
Baldwin Locomotive Works	69818 – 69867	1943	50	2590 – 2639
Baldwin Locomotive Works	69903 – 70038	1943	136	2640 – 2775
Lima Locomotive Works	8429 – 8456	1943	28	2776 – 2803
American Locomotive Company	70959 – 71008	1943	50	2804 – 2853
American Locomotive Company	71051 – 71186	1943	136	2854 – 2989
American Locomotive Company	71455 – 71459	1943	5	3200 – 3204
American Locomotive Company	71460 – 71634	1944	175	3205 – 3379
Baldwin Locomotive Works	70337 – 70516	1944	180	3380 – 3559
Lima Locomotive Works	8473 – 8612	1944	140	3560 – 3699
American Locomotive Company	71895 – 71944	1943	50	3700 – 3749
American Locomotive Company	73394 – 73475	1945	82	4402 – 4483
Lima Locomotive Works	8814 – 8858	1945	45	5155 – 5199
Lima Locomotive Works	8623 – 8662	1944	40	5700 – 5739
Lima Locomotive Works	8678 – 8699	1944	22	5740 – 5761
Lima Locomotive Works	8700 – 8707	1944	8	5762 – 5769
Lima Locomotive Works	8708 – 8797	1945	90	5770 – 5859
Baldwin Locomotive Works	72058 – 72112	1945	55	6024 – 6078

== British deployment ==
800 locomotives were constructed in 1942/3 in thirteen batches, split between ALCO, Baldwin and Lima Locomotive Works. Shipped to South Wales and dispatched from the Great Western Railway locomotive depot at Ebbw Junction, Newport, the first 43 locomotives were transferred to the London & North Eastern Railway's Doncaster Works for completion, and later running in over the East Coast Main Line. This started a pattern whereby each of the four British railway companies eventually deployed a total of 400 S160s under the guise of "running in," but factually replacing damaged stock and increasing the capacity of the British railway system to allow for shipping of military pre-invasion equipment and troops. The eventual deployment of S160's were:

- 174 to the Great Western Railway
- 168 to the London & North Eastern Railway
- 50 to the London, Midland & Scottish Railway
- 6 to the Southern Railway

The second batch of 400 S160s were prepared for storage by USATC personnel at the Great Western's Ebbw Junction locomotive depot in the immediate run-up to D-Day. After the D-Day invasion of Normandy, the locomotives were deployed across Britain again began to be collected and be refurbished at Ebbw Junction in preparation for shipment to Europe.

=== Operational failures ===
The S160s were designed for quick and efficient building, not long-term operations, thus compromises in design led to some difficulties in operation. The axle-box grease-lubricators were not very efficient, particularly when maintenance procedures lapsed or were delayed for operational war reasons, and so axle-boxes often ran hot. Braking was poor by modern standards, with a Westinghouse steam brake used for the locomotive, which was woefully insufficient, due to the long distance from the driver's valve to the brake cylinder.

A major fault of the S160 was use of a single water gauge of a Klinger design, unfamiliar to U.K. crews; it was necessary to open the top and bottom cocks slowly or the check valves would close, trapping water in the gauge and giving a false reading. If the valves were not fully open, the crews could be misled into thinking that the water level was adequate, even though it was becoming dangerously low. When a low water condition allowed the crown sheet to overheat, the stay bolts holding the crown sheet would fail with little warning, resulting in a boiler explosion. In a space of ten months, three UK S160s suffered a collapse of the firebox crown, with the first leading to the death of a GWR fireman on No. 2403 in November 1943. Although there are claims that the stay bolts or firebox design were less than for domestic locomotive boilers, the locomotives were equipped with a "boiler built to comply in all aspects with the A.S.M.E. Boiler Code, except that the shell shall have a factor safety of 4."

== Deployment ==
Judging accurately the actual deployment of 2120 locomotives is difficult, but the following numbers are referenced:

=== Europe ===
The British locomotives, together with those shipped direct from America were also similarly deployed first with troops reclaiming Europe, and then subsumed throughout European national railways as replacements for their destroyed stock after the war:

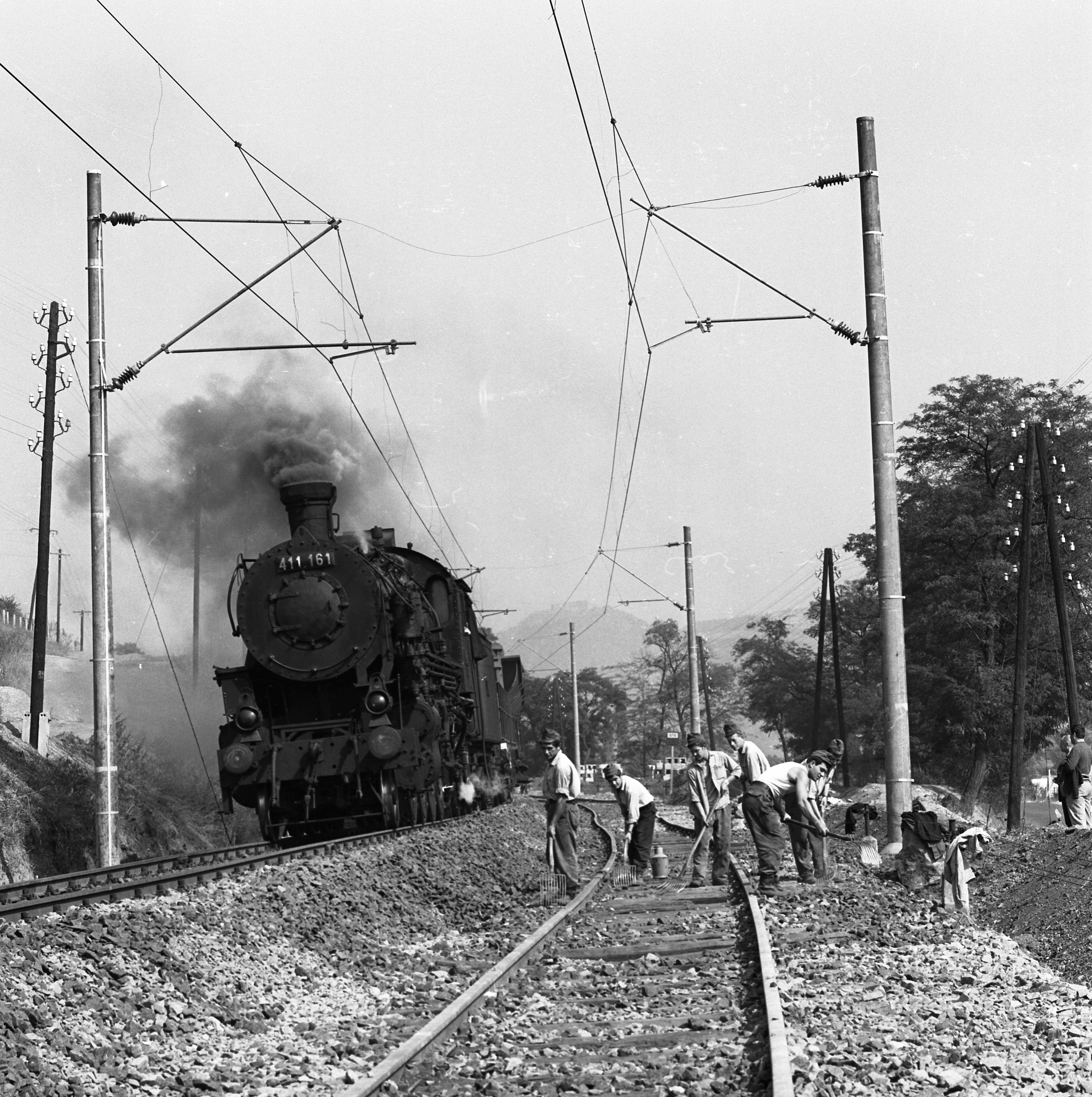
MÁV 411.061 on the Budapest to Szob line at Zebegény in 1971

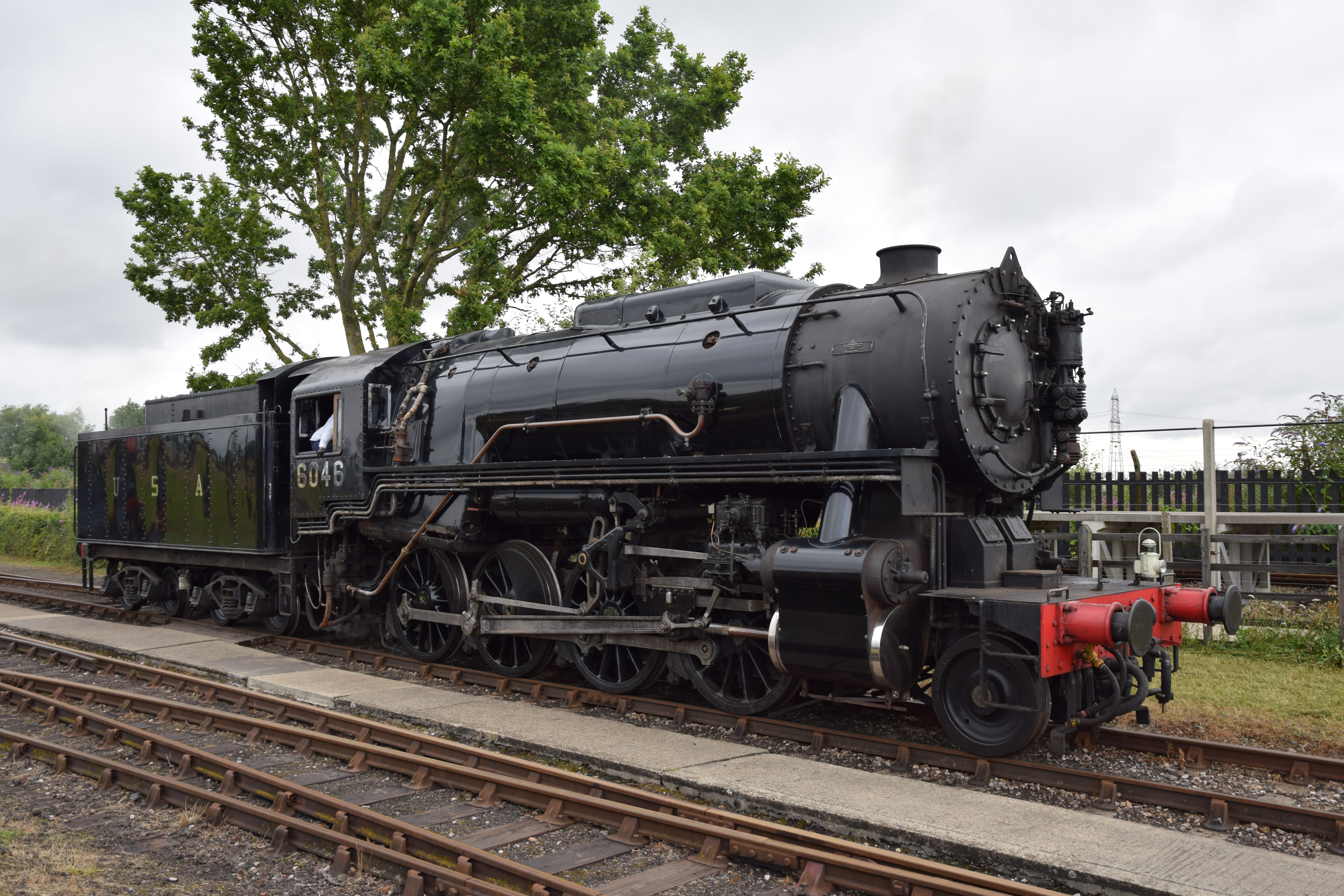
Loco 6046 at Didcot

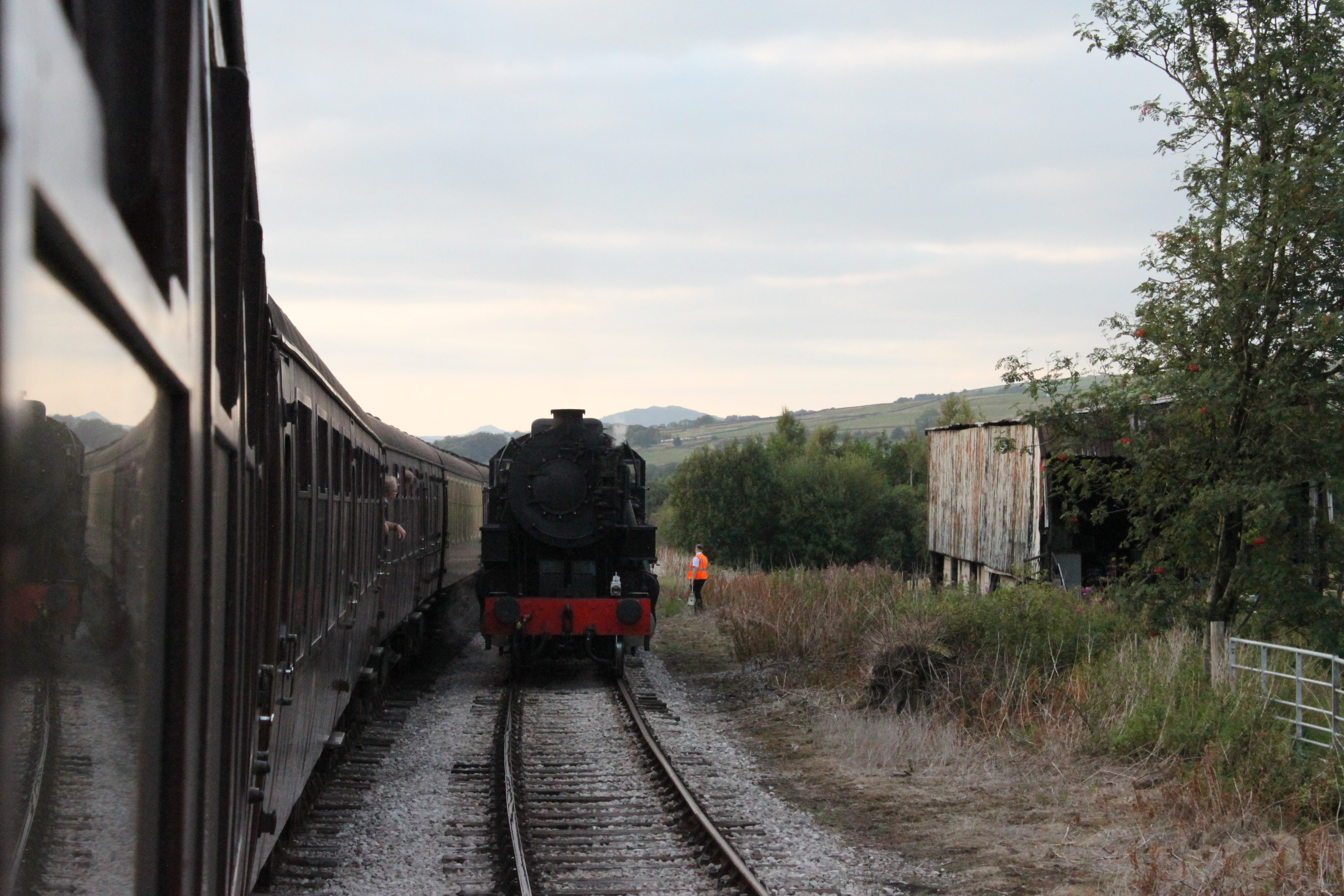
S160 USATC Class No.5197 at Churnet Valley Railway

- Austria, ÖBB Class 956 – 30 examples, all scrapped
- Czechoslovakia, ČSD Class 456.1 – 80 examples, last of them (456.173) withdrawn in 1972 and scrapped the following year
- France, SNCF Class 140U – 121 examples, all passed on to other countries by 1947;
- Germany – 40 examples briefly used in 1947 in American and British zones, based in Bremen. All sold to Hungary in August 1947;
- Greece, Class Θγ (THg) – 27 examples received in 1947 (Θγ 521 to 537 and Θγ 551 to 560), plus 25 examples bought from Italian FS railways in 1959 (Θγ 571 to 595);
- Hungary, MÁV Class 411 – 510 examples, bought at $10 000 for coal-fired ones, and $10 000, $16 000 or $20 000 for oil-fired ones, depending on condition. 484 were put into service with road numbers from 411,001 through 411,484. A further 26 were cannibalized for spares;
- Italy, FS Class 736 – 244 examples, plus four salvaged from a sunken ship, all but eight with oil firing. 25 sold to Greece in 1959, the rest were withdrawn in early 1960s
- Poland, PKP Class Tr201 – PKP received 75 S160s from UNRRA and numbered them Tr201-1 through 75; a further 500 arrived from the USATC as class Tr203, numbered Tr203-1 through 500. In PKP service, boiler pressure was reduced to 13 bar (1,300 kPa; 190 psi) and maximum speed was set at 65 km/h (40 mph). Modifications included fitting Trofimov piston valves, electric headlights and cab side doors. One engine was converted to a Tank locomotive in 1957, and designated class TKr55
- Soviet Union, Class Ш^{A} (Sh^{A}) – 200 machines ordered from Baldwin (Ш^{A} 1 to 90) and ALCO (Ш^{A} 91 to 200), designated S162s and S166s. Ш^{A} 52 to 55, 69 and 70 were lost en route to Vladivostok and Ш^{A} 13 remained in the USA. In 1957, 50 of them were for 1,067 mm (3 ft 6 in) track and used by the southern Sakhalin Railway
- Spain, Renfe Class 553 – in 1958 the Alaska Railroad sold six S160s to the Ferrocarril de Langreo
- Turkey, TCDD Class 45171 – 50 units, numbered 45171 to 45220
- United Kingdom – none in use with any of the mainline railways after World War II, as almost all were exported post D-Day. However, one was kept back by the British Army, ALCO-built works number 71512, and used at the Longmoor Military Railway as WD 93257 "Carl R Gray Jr" until it was scrapped in 1957. Some have now been re-imported for use by preserved railways.
- Yugoslavia, JŽ Class 37 - 80 examples.

=== Africa ===
At the same time as S160s were being deployed into Britain, when General Patton led American troops in Operation Torch into the North African Campaign, their Transport Corps brought the S160s with them. These locomotives moved across the north of the continent as Patton's troops waged war, and when the troops moved to Italy the majority of their S160s moved up with them. These locomotives, supplemented with those directly imported from America, were eventually to create a group of 243 locomotives, subsumed by the Italian State Railway's to become the FS Class 736 class.

- Algeria, Class 140-U – number unknown
- Morocco, Class 140-B – number unknown
- Tunisia, Class 140-250 – number unknown

=== Americas ===
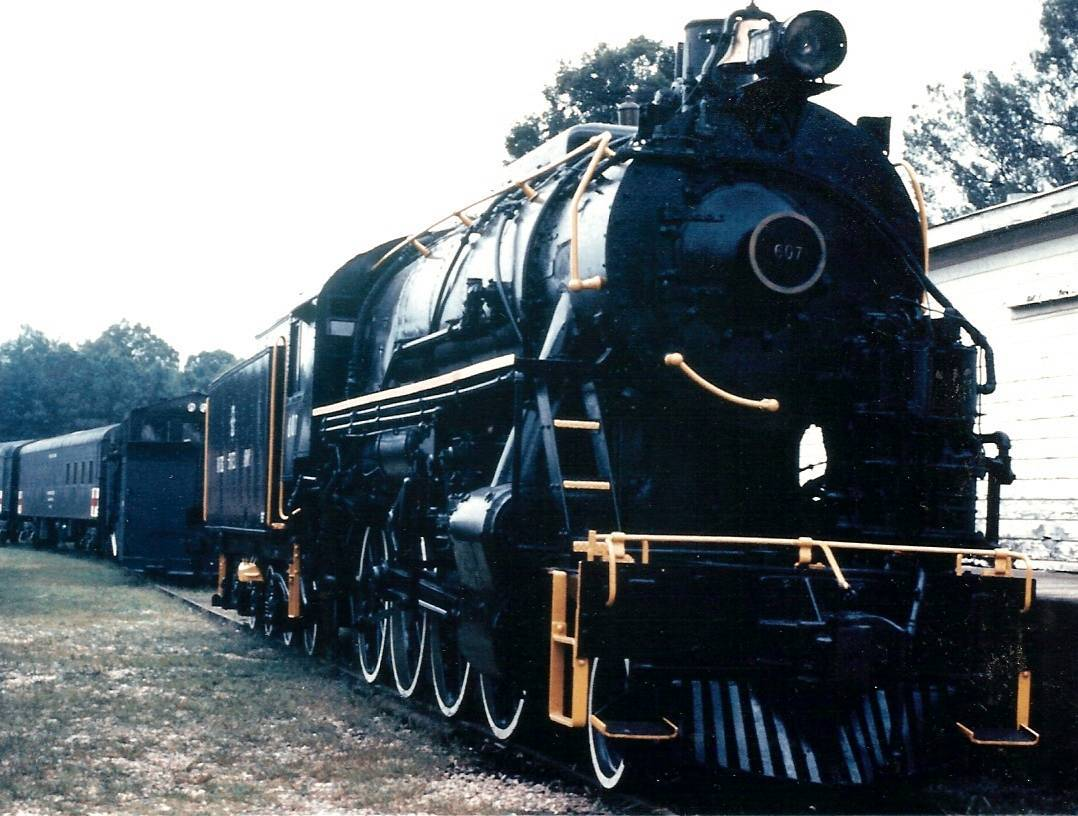
607 at the U.S. Army Transportation Museum

- Mexico, although it has been claimed that class GR-28 – 10 examples purchased by FCM directly from Baldwin in 1946 and allocated service numbers 211 to 220, were derived from the S-160, unlike an S-160 the spacing of the third and fourth driver is wider than between the other two, driver diameter is given as 60 inch vs 57 inch, and bore and stroke are 22X28 vs 19X26.
- Peru, class 80 – 2 examples, with different couplers, probably directly from ALCO in 1943
- United States – an unknown number with USATC and then various military transportation units. Five surplus to requirements of the Alaska Railroad later shipped to Spain

=== Asia ===
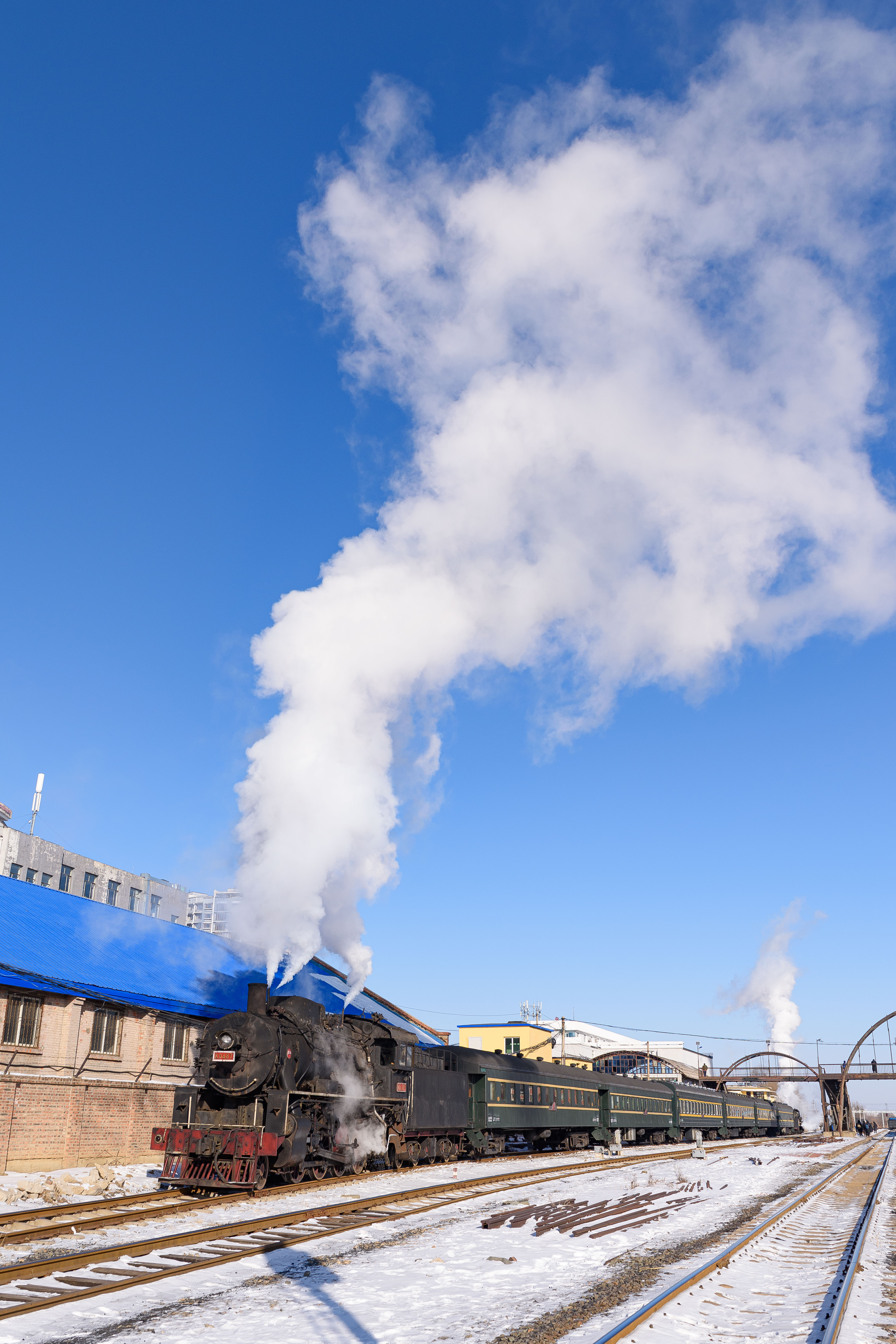
The KD6-487 hauling a heritage tourist train in Diaobingshan, Liaoning, China

Under the United Nations Relief and Rehabilitation Administration, a number of S160s were deployed to China and South Korea. In addition to this, a 1944 batch of 60 from Baldwin were sent to India and locally assembled.

- China, KD6 Class – number unknown. Many were modernized with larger cabs, higher stacks, some fitted with large smoke lifters with horizontal riffles. They were later transferred to industrial operators, mainly coal mines. The last example was withdrawn in 1990, with 2 surviving; 463 & 487.
- North Korea, 8000 series - number unknown. The DPRK's S160s came from the Soviet Union and China, starting almost immediately following the end of the Second World War, and the Korean State Railway eventually numbered them in the 8000 series. Ironically, the S160s were used by both North and South Korean forces during this conflict.
- South Korea, 소리2 (Sori2) class, 소리2-1 — 소리2-100. 100 S160s were delivered to the Korean National Railroad in 1947. In KNR service they were used primarily in yard duty and occasional short local trains, but they were not popular with Korean locomotive crews, as they were right-hand drive on a left-running railway.
- India, Class AWC – 60 locomotives were sent to India in kit form for local assembly as 5 ft 6 in (1,676 mm) broad gauge engines. Originally allocated USATC numbers 3433–3492 (Baldwin 70390–70449, 1944) they had their running numbers increased by 3000 by the Indian authorities to avoid numbers in use by the local railway companies. They were split between the East Indian Railway and the South Indian Railway; at the all-India renumbering scheme the former EIR locomotives became 22601–22614, and SIR locomotives became 22615–22660. Forty-five were still in service as of June 1977.

== Class designation ==
Although "S160" has been popularly adopted as the class identification for this design of War Department Consolidation, it can not be verified as an official designation despite considerable research. The S160 designation is not found in 1942 and 1943 Baldwin drawing indexes, the Lima drawing index for the class, nor in meeting minutes in which representatives of the War Department and the three builders made several design decisions prior to production. It is also not found in any of approximately 900 engineering drawings which are still in existence. The Baldwin designation for the design, 2-8-0-19S, is found in their drawing indexes, on some drawings, and is stamped onto major locomotive components on examples built by Baldwin.

== Variants ==
There were several major variants of the S160 class, excluding in-life design development:

- S161 - designed for deployment in Jamaica on British military railways used by the United States. Later subsumed by the Jamaica Railway Corporation
- S162 and S166 - both designed for Russian five foot broad gauge track.
- Sixty 5 ft 6 in (1,676 mm) broad gauge examples were constructed for use in India in 1944 as part of an order for 180 locomotives which also include one locomotive configured to Alaska Railroad specifications.
- There were several variations in equipment from the "standard" design for the War Department Consolidations, depending on the user. Typically, European-style buffers and couplers and kerosene lighting were fitted. Examples for India, the U.S.S.R., at least six purchased new for the Alaska Railroad, and possibly approximately 10 which remained on U.S. Army bases were fitted with turbo-generators and electric lighting. The six purchased new for the Alaska Railroad were also fitted by Baldwin with U.S. style automatic couplers, bells, power reverse, and U.S. style pilots. Some later production had screw type reverse gear. The War Department also required that the locomotives could be configured to burn either coal or oil.

== Preservation ==
Mainly due to their numbers, rather than the design or build quality, at least 26 examples of the S160 have survived into preservation, making them one of the most numerous survivors of all Mainline Steam Locomotives:

USATC No.	Builder	Post World War II Owner	Current Owner	Location	Image	Notes
1631	Alco 70284	MÁV 411.388	Great Central Railway (Nottingham)	Ruddington, Nottinghamshire		under restoration
2138	Alco 70620	MÁV 411.380	Churnet Valley Railway	Stoke-on-Trent, Staffordshire		Source of strategic spares for 5197 and 6046
2364	Baldwin 69621	MÁV 411.337	Churnet Valley Railway	Stoke-on-Trent, Staffordshire		Chassis only, source for strategic spares for 5197 and 6046
2627	Baldwin 69855	Alaska Railroad 556	City of Anchorage	Anchorage, Alaska		Restored for static display in 2015.
3523	Baldwin 70480	Alaska Railroad 557	Engine 557 Restoration Company	Wasilla, Alaska		Under restoration for operation from August 2012 through present (as of March 2025).
5846	Lima 8784	US Army 606	Crewe Railroad Museum	Crewe, Virginia		Re-lettered to Norfolk and Western #606
5187	Lima 8846	US Army 5187; US Army 607	US Army Transportation Museum	Fort Eustis Military Railroad		
2628	Baldwin 69856	US Army 611	Bill Miller Equipment Sales	Eckhart Mines, Maryland		Fitted with Franklin Type B Rotary Cam Poppet valve gear, which is intended for use on the PRR 5550 project, undergoing restoration. Tender supposedly used behind Pershing No. 28 in Texas.
2630	Baldwin 69858	US Army 612	Age of Steam Roundhouse	Sugarcreek, Ohio		From Southeastern Railway Museum, Duluth, Georgia
1702	Baldwin 64641	Reader Railroad	Great Smoky Mountains Railroad	Bryson City, North Carolina		Operational
5197	Lima 8856	Fushun Industrial Railway, #KD6.463	Churnet Valley Railway	Stoke-on-Trent, Staffordshire		Overhaul began 2013, returned to service February 2017.
?	?	Fushun Industrial Railway, #KD6.487	Tiefa Railway			Preserved on the Tiefa railway.
6046	Baldwin 72080	MÁV 411.144	Churnet Valley Railway	Stoke-on-Trent, Staffordshire		Overhaul finished July 2012, Returned to service December 2012. Withdrawn for 10 yearly overhaul in April 2022, and returned again in September 2023.
2253	Baldwin 69496	PKP Tr.203.208	Peter Best	Grosmont, North Yorkshire (North Yorkshire Moors Railway)		6 June 2019 Full restoration completed by Steam Powered Services in Stockton. Renamed Omaha Beach (shortened to 'Omaha') honouring the 75th anniversary of the D-Day invasion. 2024-2026 converted to oil firing.
5820	Lima 8758	PKP Tr.203.474	Keighley & Worth Valley Railway	West Yorkshire		Returned to service in January 2014 following overhaul
3278	Baldwin 70340	FS 736.073; SEK Θγ575	Richard Stone	Stoke-on-Trent, Staffordshire		#701 Franklin D. Roosevelt, under overhaul at Churnet Valley Railway, last steamed at Watercress Line in 1999.
5164	Lima 8823	PKP Tr.201.51	Polskie Koleje Państwowe	Jaworzyna Śląska		
2438	ALCO 70787	PKP Tr.203.296	Polskie Koleje Państwowe	Jaworzyna Śląska		
5801	Lima 8739	PKP Tr203-451	Polskie Koleje Państwowe	Warsaw Railway Museum		
2781	Lima 8434	MÁV 411.264	Railway station	Hatvan		Plinthed
6056	Baldwin 72090	MÁV 411.358	Railway station	Hegyeshalom		Plinthed
1786	Baldwin 67679	MÁV 411.005	Unknown	Komarom		Boiler only.
2206	Lima 8212	SEK Θγ 525	OSE	Thessaloniki Old Depot		stored
2524	Lima 8341	TCDD 45172	Turkish State Railways	Çamlık Railway Museum		
2879	Alco 71076	TCDD 45174	Turkish State Railways	Ankara Railway Museum		
3292	Alco 71547	FS 736.083	Museo Ferroviario Piemontese	Turin		Awaiting restoration
3324	Alco 71579	FS 736.114	FS	Pietrarsa railway museum		
—	Baldwin-Lima-Hamilton 75503	US Army 610	Tennessee Valley Railroad Museum	Chattanooga, Tennessee		Out of service for its 1472 inspection & rebuild. 610 is technically not an S-160 but classified as a type A, constructed in 1952
3524	Baldwin 70481	SEK Θγ 532	OSE	Thessaloniki Old Depot		stored
2226	Lima 8232	SEK Θγ 535	OSE	Thessaloniki Old Depot		stored
3299	ALCo 71554	FS 736.090; SEK Θγ 576	OSE	Tithorea Depot		stored. Oil burner, bought from Italian FS (Class 736) in 1959
3420	Baldwin 70377	FS 736.158; SEK Θγ 584	OSE	Thessaloniki Old Depot		stored. Oil burner, bought from Italian FS (Class 736) in 1959. Has tender from Θγ 689
3698	Lima 8611	FS 736.207; SEK Θγ 593	OSE	Thessaloniki Depot		stored. Oil burner, bought from Italian FS (Class 736) in 1959

== See also ==
- USATC S100 Class, a tank engine also built by the US Army Transportation Corps for wartime export
- WD Austerity Class, a comparable 2-8-0 built in Britain for the war effort

== Bibliography ==
- Boddy, M.G.; Brown, W.A.; Neve, E.; Yeadon, W.B. (November 1983). Fry, E.V. (ed.). Locomotives of the L.N.E.R., part 6B: Tender Engines - Classes O1 to P2. Kenilworth: Railway Correspondence & Travel Society. ISBN 0-901115-54-1.
- Hughes, Hugh (1979). Steam Locomotives in India, Part 3 – Broad Gauge. Harrow, Middlesex: The Continental Railway Circle. ISBN 0-9503469-4-2.
- Rakov, V. A. (1995). Lokomotivy otechestvennykh zheleznykh dorog 1845–1955 (in Russian). Moscow. ISBN 5-277-00821-7.
- Tourret, R. (1977). United States Army Transportation Corps Locomotives. Abingdon: Tourret Publishing. ISBN 0-905878-01-9.
