= Turbine locomotive =

Turbine locomotive may refer to:

- Gas turbine locomotive, uses a gas turbine as a power source and drives the wheels via a mechanical transmission
- Gas turbine–electric locomotive, uses a gas turbine to power an alternator, which in turn powers traction motors
- Steam turbine locomotive, uses a boiler and steam turbine as a power source
