= GT3 =

GT3 may refer to:

== Automotive ==
- Porsche 911 GT3, a high performance version of the Porsche 911
  - IMSA GT3 Cup Challenge, a one-make racing series featuring the Porsche 911 GT3
    - IMSA GT3 Cup Challenge Canada, the Canadian subsidiary series
- Group GT3, a class of auto racing
  - FIA GT3 European Championship, a defunct series based on Group GT3
- GT3 (1998–1999), a former class of auto racing for grand touring cars, used by IMSA and the SCCA

== Other uses ==
- Gran Turismo 3: A-Spec, a 2001 car racing game developed for the PlayStation 2
- British Rail GT3, a prototype gas turbine locomotive
- Denel GT-3, a South African tank cannon
