= 18100 =

18100 may refer to:

- British Rail 18100 - a prototype gas turbine-electric locomotive built for British Railways in 1951
- 18100 Lebreton - a minor planet
- 18,100 - a number
