= SBB Am 4/6 1101 =

Swiss gas turbine electric locomotive

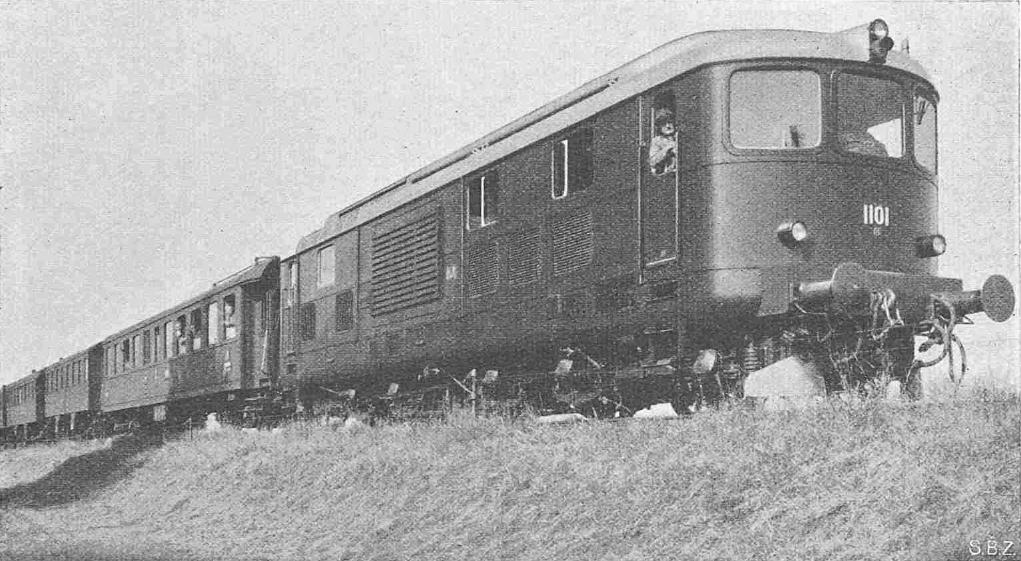
- 1942 publicity photo of Am 4/6 number 1101
Type and origin
- Power type: Gas turbine–electric
- Builder: Swiss Locomotive and Machine Works
- Total produced: 1
Specifications
- Configuration
  - AAR: 1-D-1, later 1A-B-A1
  - UIC: 1′Do1′, later (1A)Bo(A1)
- Gauge: 1,435 mm (4 ft 8 1/2 in)
- Length: 16,340 mm (53 ft 7 in) over buffers
- Width: 2,970 mm (9 ft 9 in)
- Height: 3,933 mm (12 ft 11 in)
- Axle load: 16 tonnes (16 long tons; 18 short tons)
- Adhesive weight: 59 tonnes (58 long tons; 65 short tons)
- Loco weight: 92 tonnes (91 long tons; 101 short tons)
- Fuel capacity: 4,200 litres (920 imp gal; 1,100 US gal)
- Lubricant cap.: 850 litres (190 imp gal; 220 US gal)
Performance figures
- Maximum speed: 110 km/h (68 mph)
- Power output: At wheel: 1,030 kW (1,380 hp); Turbine: 1,620 kW (2,170 hp)
- Tractive effort: Continuous: 48.4 kN (10,900 lbf) at 70 km/h (43 mph); One hour: 76.0 kN (17,100 lbf) at 50 km/h (31 mph); Maximum: 130 kN (29,200 lbf) at up to 26 km/h (16 mph)
Career
- Operators: Swiss Federal Railways
- Class: Am 4/6
- Numbers: 1101
- Delivered: 1941
- Retired: 1958
- Disposition: Rebuilt as an all electric locomotive, Ae 4/6 III 10851, starting in 1958. Scrapped in 1978.

Am 4/6 1101 was the world's first gas turbine–electric locomotive. The locomotive was ordered by the Swiss Federal Railways (SBB) from the Swiss Locomotive and Machine Works (SLM) and Brown, Boveri & Cie (BBC) in 1939. The locomotive was delivered in 1941 and was in use on railroads in Switzerland, France and Germany until 1954.

== Development ==
Prior to building Am 4/6 1101 BBC had built the world’s first industrial gas turbine in 1936 for the Marcus Hook refinery in Pennsylvania and the world's first gas turbine power station at Neuchâtel, Switzerland. By the late 1930s, BBC were eager to apply the new gas turbine technology to railway locomotives.

Early in 1939, SBB placed an order, with BBC, for a gas turbine locomotive for service on non electrified branch lines. The specification for the locomotive included a guaranteed continuous output of 2,200 hp (1,641 kW) measured at the generator coupling. A starting tractive effort of 29,000 lb (13,154 kg) was specified along with a continuous tractive effort of 11,000 lb (4,990 kg) at 45 mph (72 km/h). A maximum speed of 70 mph (113 km/h) was given. The maximum allowable weight of the locomotive for use on branch lines was set at 92 tons.

== Technology ==
=== Construction ===
The locomotive was based on existing technology wherever possible to avoid failures of components not directly associated with the gas turbine from endangering the project. Electric power transmission was chosen because it had already shown its reliability in conjunction with diesel engines and because it allowed as many axles as desired to be driven, which was an important aspect because the weight per power output was much lower compared to diesel and steam engines of the time. A possible alternative would have been a hydraulic transmission, but this technology was not yet considered ready for powers above about 300 kW (400 hp).

The turbine consisted of an air compressor, a combustion chamber and the turbine itself. The air compressor needed about 4,500 kW (6,000 hp) to push the air into the combustion chamber (air pressures of 1 to 3 kgf/cm^{2} (0.098 to 0.294 MPa; 14 to 43 psi), depending on the turbine rotation speed), where the fuel was injected and burnt, leading to an expansion of the gases, which, with a temperature of 500 °C (932 °F) to 600 °C (1,112 °F), hit the turbine and produced about 6,000 kW (8,000 hp). The exhaust gases flowed through the heat exchanger, where they preheated the incoming air, and were ejected via the roof. The remaining power of about 1,500 kW (2,000 hp) was used to drive the locomotive.

=== Starting the locomotive ===
First, an auxiliary diesel engine was started by the help of batteries. This engine was coupled to a generator which, in turn, provided electricity to start the turbine. The turbine was brought up to speed by the coupled generator (used as a motor). This process took about 4 minutes after which the turbine could be ignited and would run by itself. While the turbine continued to speed up, the electricity produced by the auxiliary diesel engine could now be used to shunt the locomotive at low speeds (10 km/h or 6 mph). After another four minutes, the turbine had reached its idle speed (100 rpm at the generator) at which point the locomotive was now operational.

=== Varying the power output ===
To increase the power output, the engineer turned his power controller, which had the following effects:

- More fuel was injected into the combustion chamber
- The speed governor was adjusted to achieve a higher rotation speed
- The overload protector noticed an overload situation (rotation speed lower than the target speed) and reduced the load on the turbine

Because of the lower load and the more fuel being injected, the rotation speed increased (up to 300 rpm at the generator under full load) and at some point the turbine reached its target speed, where the load was increased again up to the desired level to reach a new equilibrium between the turbine's power output and the power needed by the traction motors.

To decrease the load, the same processes happened in reverse.

=== Safety Features ===
If the engineer increased the power output of the turbine too late (example after a grade change instead of before it), then the rotation speed of the turbine might not have risen fast enough, too much fuel might have burnt and the turbine might have overheated. A temperature alarm was shown to the driver by a warning lamp; if he did not decrease the load, the fuel supply was cut after another rise of the temperature by 30 °C (54 °F).

In the event of a sudden loss of load where a rapid rise in rotation speed could not be compensated by the speed governor, a safety device would have decreased the air supply to the turbine. The reduction in air supply would lead to a rise in temperature in the combustion chamber due to the lack of cold air which, in turn, would have led to the shutdown of the turbine due to over-temperature.

The combustion chamber was also monitored. If the temperature became too low (loss of ignition), the controller was designed to reignite the burners. If this failed the controllers would shut down the oil supply after 5 seconds.

== Efficiency ==
Peak efficiency of the gas turbine was 15-16%; note that these numbers do not include losses from the electrical power transmission. Efficiency was low compared to contemporary diesel engines which typically had fuel efficiencies around 26-28%. Poor efficiency was a major reason why gas turbine locomotives were not widely adopted.

== Operating History ==
Am 4/6 1101 was delivered to SBB in 1941 after which it underwent a period of testing. From May 1943 to July 1944 the locomotive was trialed on the Winterthur-Stein-Säckingen line where it covered distance of around 50,000 km without incident. The locomotive went on to be used in experimental service across Switzerland, France and Germany covering some 410,000 km until September of 1954 when the turbine was damaged due to blade overheating. The root cause of the turbine blade failure was identified as faulty wiring of sensor cables. SBB decided not to fix the turbine due to the high repair cost and the relatively poor fuel efficiency of the locomotive.

In 1958, SBB decided to rebuild Am 4/6 1101 as an all-electric locomotive. Renamed Ae 4/6 III 10851 the locomotive remained in service until 1978.

== See also ==
- List of stock used by Swiss Federal Railways
- British Rail 18000 - Contemporary gas turbine locomotive, also built by Brown Boveri
