= SNCF Class T 2000 =

French class of 13 turbine powered trains

RTG
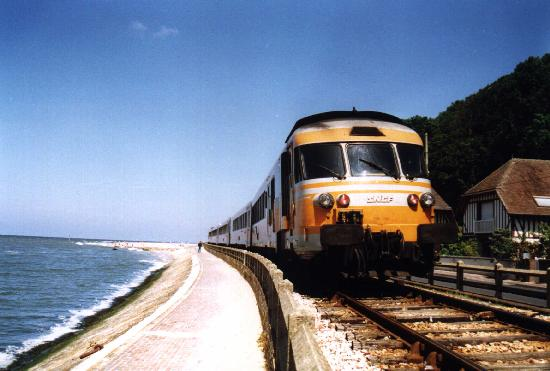
- SNCF T2000 in Houlgate on the Deauville-Dives line in 1989.
Type and origin
- Power type: Autorail
- Builder: ANF
- Build date: 1972 - 1976
Specifications
- Gauge: 1,435 mm (4 ft 8 1/2 in) standard gauge
- Length: 128.90 m (422 ft 11 in)
- Loco weight: 225 t (221 long tons; 248 short tons)
- Fuel type: Diesel fuel
- Prime mover: Turmo III, Turmo XII
- Engine type: turboshaft
Performance figures
- Maximum speed: 160 km/h (99 mph)
- Power output: 775 kW (1,039 hp)+ 1,150 kW (1,540 hp)
Career
- Operators: SNCF
- Class: T 2000
- Number in class: 13
- Numbers: T 2001 to T 2082
- Nicknames: Caravelle
- Locale: Normandy, Pays de la Loire, Aquitaine, Rhône-Alpes, Alsace, Lorraine
- Retired: 2004

SNCF Class T 2000 trainsets, also known under their French acronym RTG (Rame à turbine à gaz, i.e., gas turbine trainset), were the second generation of turbine-powered trains in France and saw commercial service from 1972 to 2004.

== History ==
Building on the successful experience of the earlier TGS and the ETG turbotrains, French state railway company SNCF commissioned the T 2000 for entry into service in the early 1970s. The objective was to offer the same service speed as electric traction (160 km/h or 99 mph at the time) on French trunk lines that had yet to be electrified.

The first trains were put into service in late 1972 on the Lyon-Strasbourg and Nantes-Bordeaux routes, two key trunk lines that were not electrified at the time. Though the trainsets were rated for 160 km/h (99 mph), they only could achieve this speed on short sections due to the ancient design of the lines (particularly on the Nantes-Bordeaux route) that restricted speed to 120 km/h (75 mph) on many segments. As the capacity of the smaller T1000s serving the Western line from Paris-Saint-Lazare to Caen and Cherbourg was proving less and less adequate, the next batch of T 2000s was affected to this line whose straighter profile allowed them at last to demonstrate superb performance and reliability.

In addition to the SNCF units, ANF built 6 very similar Turboliners for Amtrak.

The 1973 oil crisis and France's decision to invest heavily in nuclear power caused SNCF to sharply redirect its focus towards electric traction and put a stop to new orders of T 2000s, ending production at thirteen sets.

By the late 1970s T 2000 service on the Nantes-Bordeaux line stopped and all T 2000s were permanently reassigned to the Lyon-Nantes route, an unelectrified trunk line with severe gradients where turbine traction could once again demonstrate its potential.

With the electrification of the Lyon-Strasbourg (1995) and Paris-Caen-Cherbourg routes (June 1996) and the switch to regular Diesel Electric locomotive hauled traction on the Lyon-Nantes route (BB 67400 and CC 72000 power cars), the future of the T 2000 became bleak in the 1990s. It remained unrivalled on the Lyon-Bordeaux route, where four reversals are required and the T 2000's double-ended cabs avoided the considerable time involved to switch the locomotive from one end of the train to the other.

As trainsets neared the end of their life span, the fleet was reduced down to ten sets and was equipped with train-to-ground radio. Hybrid trains were eventually formed with engines from different sets to lengthen their lifespan, and the dwindling fleet (six sets in 2003, four in 2004) was finally retired at the end of 2004. With Diesel locomotives less able to maintain speed on the line's steep gradients and requiring four reversals, the direct journey from Lyon to Bordeaux has since then been lengthened from 7 hours 30 minutes to 9 hours.

== Features ==
T 2000s were equipped with two 775 kW (1,039 hp) Turbomeca Turmo III turbines which drove Voith Hydraulic Transmissions at each end and two auxiliary 300 kW (400 hp) Turbomeca Astazou turbines to power air conditioning and lighting. They were aesthetically similar to the T 1000s, sharing in particular the same driving cabin, yet were built on a longer chassis and featured five passenger cars instead of the T 1000's three. Also, the paint scheme was different and closely resembled a reversal of the T 1000's.

Each turboengine was equipped with a 3500-litre diesel tank for use on long routes, with a consumption of 430 litres per hour (95 imp gal/h; 110 US gal/h) for traction and 150 litres per hour (33 imp gal/h; 40 gal/h) for passenger comfort. Electropneumatic braking was performed by cast-iron shoe-and-disc brakes, with electromagnetic track brakes under each bogie for emergency braking.

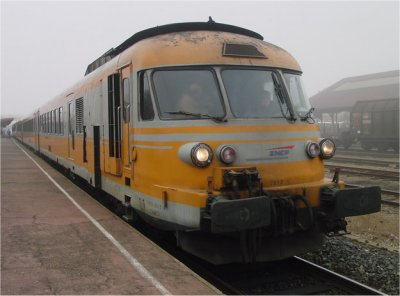
T 2013 at Roanne on 12 December 2004, a month before withdrawal.

The second oil crisis, in 1979, prompted the refitting of T 2000s with more fuel-efficient Turmo XII turbines which also offered a power increase from 775 to 1,150 kW (1,039 to 1,542 hp). Unlike T 1000s, the T 2000s' control equipment was also modified so that a coupled set could be operated by a single engineer.

== Preservation ==
One power car, number T 2057, has been preserved at the French National Railway Museum.

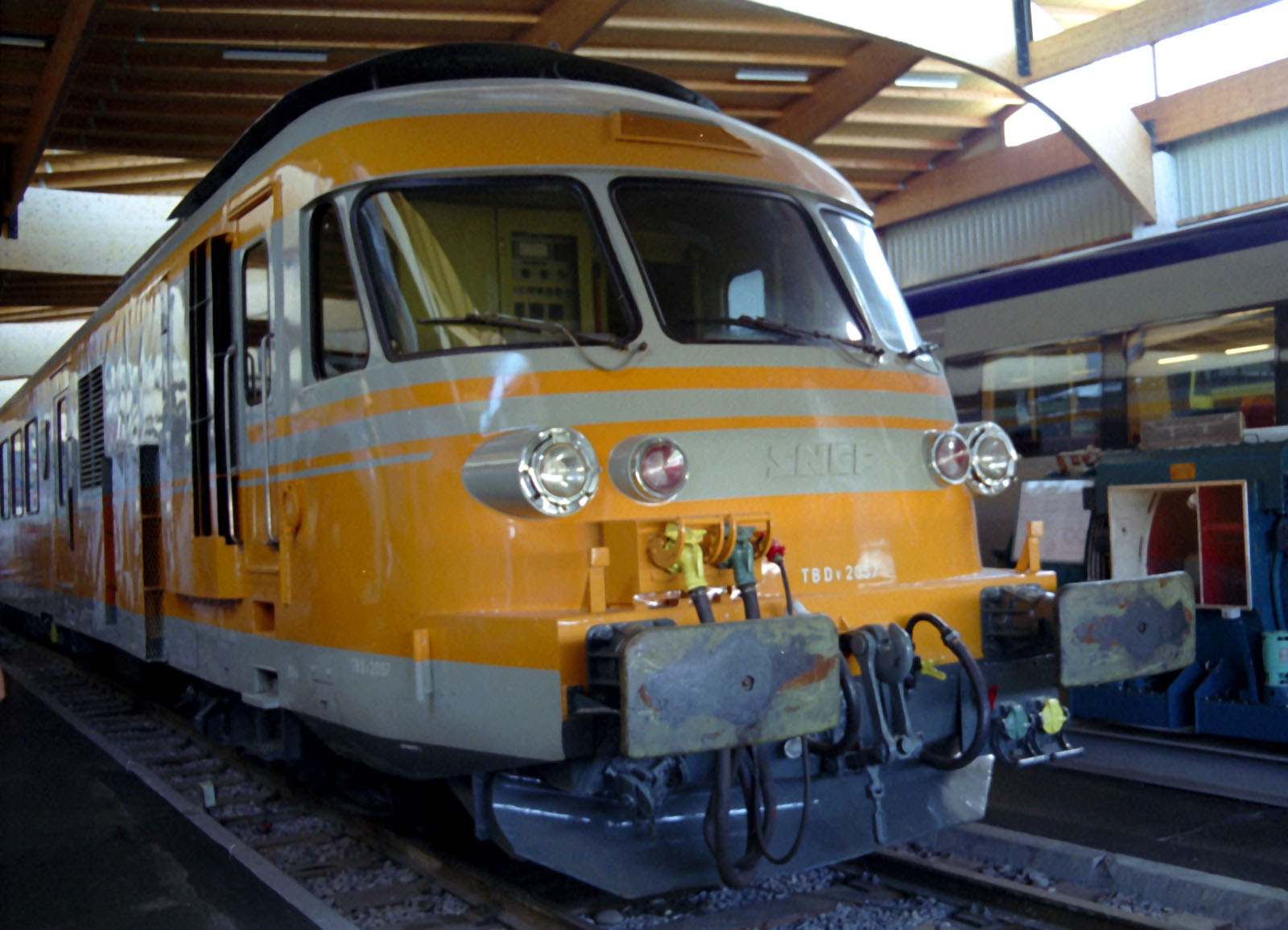
Preserved RTG power car, no. T 2057 on display at the French National Railway Museum.
