= R. Tom Sawyer =

American engineer

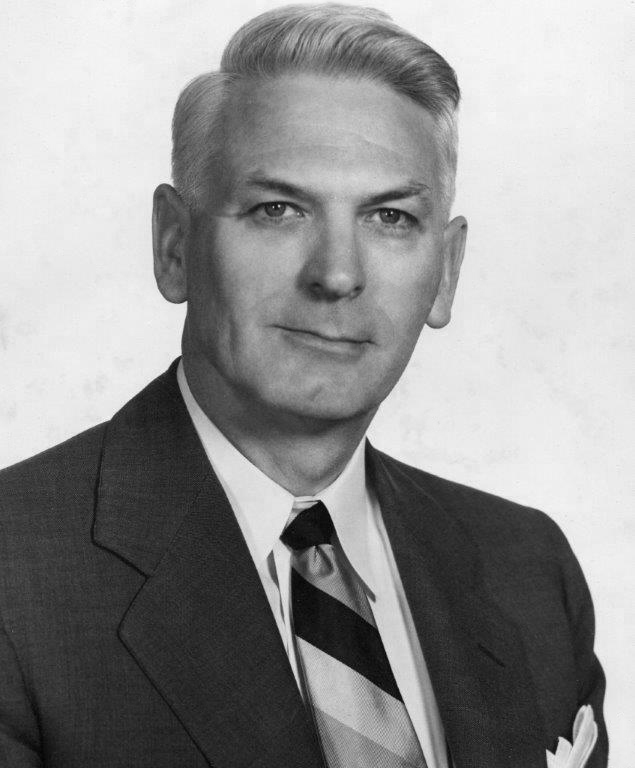
- Born: 20 June 1901
- Died: 19 January 1986 (aged 84)
- Spouse: Ruth Ennis Sawyer
- Engineering career
- Discipline: Gas turbines
- Significant advance: Founder of the American Society of Mechanical Engineer's International Gas Turbine Institute (IGTI)

Robert Thomas Sawyer (June 20, 1901 – January 19, 1986) was the founder of the American Society of Mechanical Engineer's International Gas Turbine Institute (IGTI) and among industry professionals was known as "Mr. Gas Turbine". Sawyer authored books about gas turbines, locomotives, and atomic power, and was awarded three U.S. Patents. The ASME established the R. Tom Sawyer Award to honor him for advancing gas turbine technology in all of its aspects for over 40 years. The award in his name is the highest award given by the IGTI, and is awarded annually at their international Turbo Expo.

== Education and early work ==
Sawyer was born on June 20, 1901, in Schenectady, New York, but lived most of his life in Ho-Ho-Kus, New Jersey (Ridgewood, Bergen County). He received a bachelor's degree in electrical engineering from Ohio State University in 1923 followed by a master's degree in mechanical engineering in 1930. His undergraduate thesis was entitled "Preliminary Design of 60,000 kw Steam Power Station". While an undergraduate, he was a member of Sigma Pi fraternity and Scabbard and Blade. After receiving his undergraduate degree, Sawyer began working for General Electric, where he designed and developed early diesel locomotives.

In 1928, while working on his master's degree, Sawyer rebuilt a 1920s Jordan automobile and replaced the gear box with a generator and motor. He thus created an early hybrid electric vehicle which combined the Jordan automobile's internal combustion engine (ICE) with a DC generator that powered an electric motor to drive the axles.

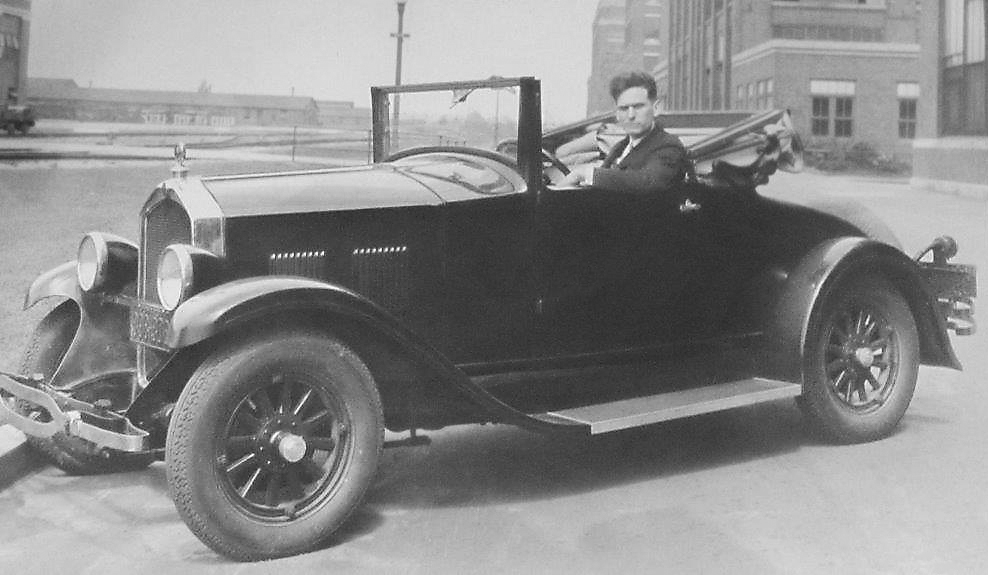
1920's Jordan automobile with R. Tom Sawyer, who successfully converted it to a hybrid-electric in 1928. He then drove it for 60,000 miles in the US and Australia as a demonstration of its capability

Sawyer drove the car for 60,000 miles in the United States and Australia as a demonstration of its capability. He determined, however, that the electrical parts were too heavy and expensive to be practical, so he discontinued the project and donated the Jordan car to the Mechanical Engineering laboratory at Ohio State University. Sawyer remained in Australia for a year working as an engineer for Australian General Electric, where he worked on gas-electric railroad cars.

In 1929, Sawyer visited Dr. Alfred Büchi, the Swiss inventor of supercharging, when Buchi was testing the turbocharger on a large diesel engine in the Sulzer Winterthur plant. It was here that Sawyer first saw a gas turbine without a combustor in the form of the Buchi diesel supercharger.

== Career ==
Sawyer then joined the American Locomotive Company, where he served as head of research working on both diesel and gas turbine projects from 1930 to 1956. While working for General Electric in 1925, Sawyer helped assemble and delivered the very first diesel locomotive sold in the United States.

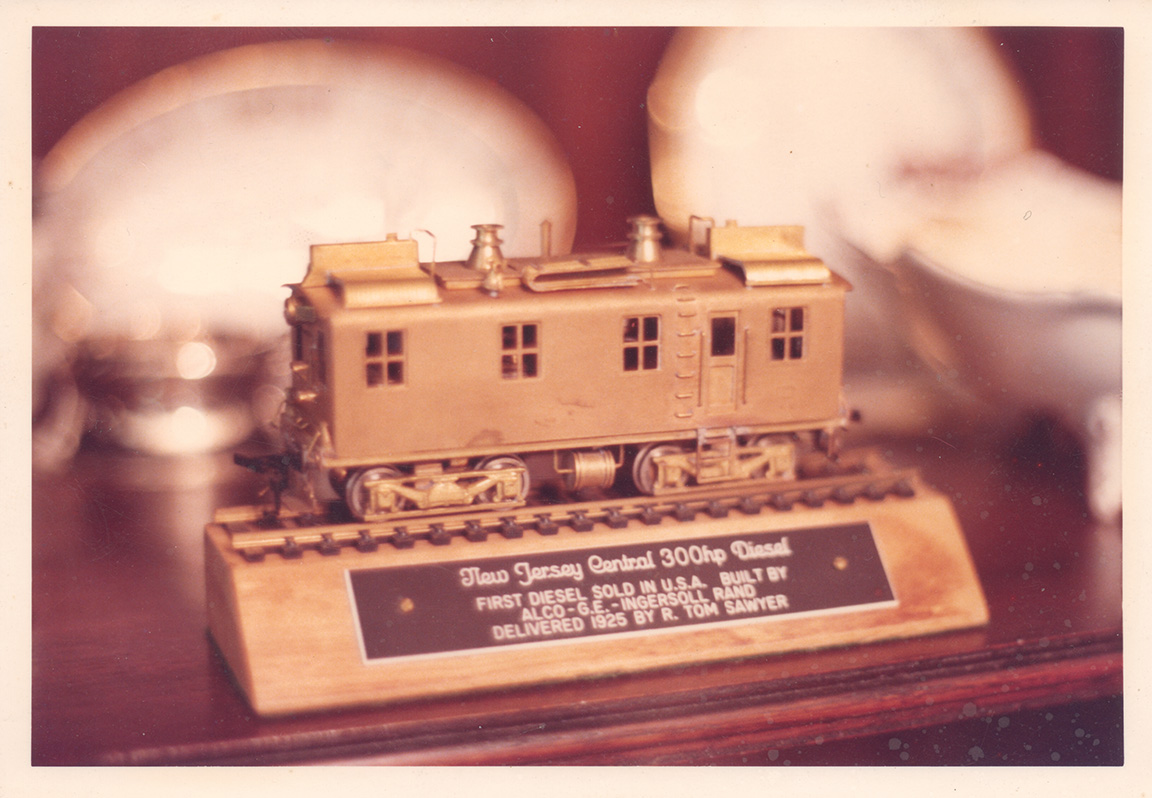
Award for building and delivering the first diesel locomotive sold in the US – given to R. Tom Sawyer

In 1944 Sawyer applied for one of the first gas turbine powered locomotive patents. The patent was granted in 1948.

In 1945, Sawyer published The Modern Gas Turbine which delineated the history and application of gas turbines including a description of initial testing of the Neuchâtel 4 MW gas turbine by Brown Boveri which was the first electric power industrial gas turbine.

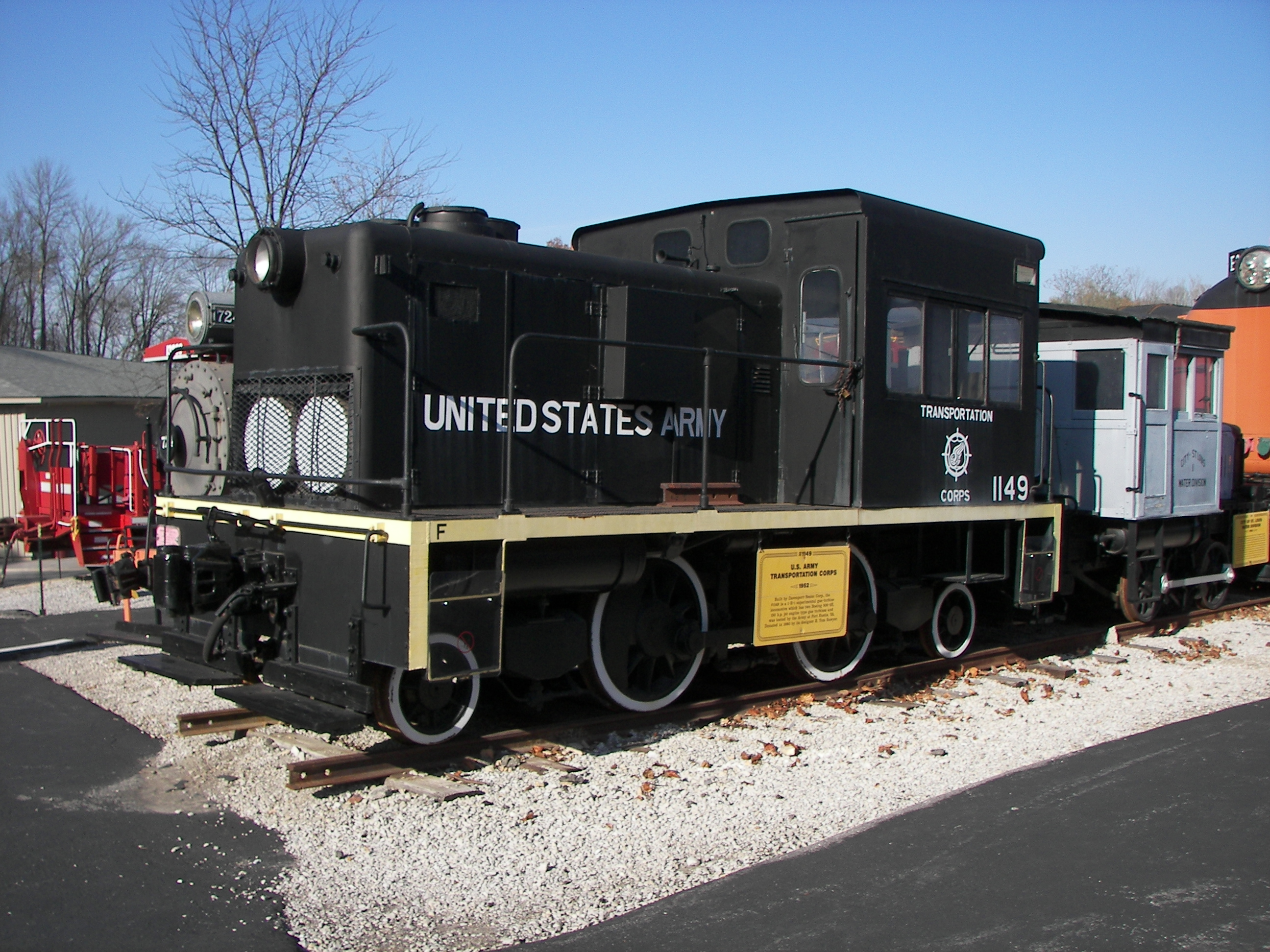
Gas turbine locomotive 1149

Sawyer worked as a technical advisor to the U.S. Army during the 1950s, where he helped develop the application of gas turbines, through mechanical drive, to a locomotive which was the first step in applying nuclear power to military transportation. During this period, he designed the first gas turbine locomotive to use a Brayton cycle gas turbine with a direct mechanical drive. The resulting locomotive was a small switcher built by the Davenport Locomotive Works and delivered to the army in 1954. This was also the first railway locomotive to use aeroderivative gas turbines being powered by two Boeing 502-2E engines.

Sawyer was instrumental in organizing and presenting the first ASME gas turbine technical papers. During May 8–10, 1944, ASME's 17th National Oil and Gas Power Conference was held in Tulsa, Oklahoma, where there was intense interest in emerging gas turbine technology. On May 7, 1944, the day before the conference, the executive committee of the Oil and Gas Power Division voted to form a Gas Turbine Coordinating Committee (GTCC) to facilitate dissemination of information related to the gas turbine through meetings and the presentation of technical papers. GTCC with Sawyer of the American Locomotive Company as its chairman was the beginning of the IGTI.

Sawyer lived in Ho-Ho-Kus, New Jersey, which was close to New York City. Sawyer commissioned a jeweler in New York City to make a die to cast a miniature multi-bladed axial-flow turbine "wheel" lapel pin. Gold turbine wheels from this design have been awarded by IGTI to many volunteers over the years. In 1964, Sawyer contacted the Broadway ASCAP songwriter Arthur Kent, most famous for The End of the World, to compose IGTI's song Onward and Upward with Gas Turbines which was later modernized by a Nashville lyricist. Sawyer remained involved with IGTI until his death in 1986.

== Publications, patents, and other activities ==
Sawyer edited the Gas Turbine International Magazine for many years and served as the editorial chairman. He also served on the board of the American Rocket Society. Sawyer worked as a consultant and independent developer of gas turbines until his retirement in 1972. He authored various books including Introduction to the Gas Turbine Locomotive, Gas Turbine Construction, The Modern Gas Turbine, and co-authored Applied Atomic Power. He also wrote The Diesel and the Gas Turbine which was re-printed from the October 1945 issue of Atomic and Gas Turbine Progress as a booklet for the Engineering Department of the American Locomotive Company. In 1968, The American Gas Turbine Catalog was renamed Sawyer's Gas Turbine Catalog.

Sawyer was awarded patents for a Power System (US1871472), Power Plant (US2526424), and a Rotary Engine Power Plant (US2445973).

== Personal life ==
Sawyer was married to Ruth Ennis Sawyer, daughter of Joseph B. Ennis, who was the vice president and director of engineering for the American Locomotive Company. They had two children and five grandchildren.

== The R. Tom Sawyer Award ==
In 1972, ASME established the R. Tom Sawyer Award to honor him for advancing gas turbine technology over 40 years. The award is given annually at IGTI's international Turbo Expo to "an individual who has made important contributions to advance the purpose of the Gas Turbine Institute over a substantial period of time". It is the highest award given by the IGTI.

== Publications ==
- Sawyer, R. Tom (1945). The Diesel and the Gas Turbine. Schenectady, New York: American Locomotive Company.
- Sawyer, R. Tom (1946). Applied Atomic Power. New York, NY: Prentice-Hall.
- Sawyer, R. Tom (1947). Introduction to the Gas Turbine Locomotive. New York, NY: Prentice-Hall.
- Sawyer, Robert Thomas (1947). Gas Turbine Construction: Including Operation and Maintenance. New York, NY: Prentice-Hall.
- Sawyer, R. Tom (1947). The Modern Gas Turbine. New York, NY: Prentice-Hall.
- Sawyer, R. Tom (1968). Sawyer's Gas Turbine Catalog (1968-1971 ed.). Stamford, CT: Gas Turbine Publications, Inc.
