= Turbotrain =

French high-speed, gas turbine trains

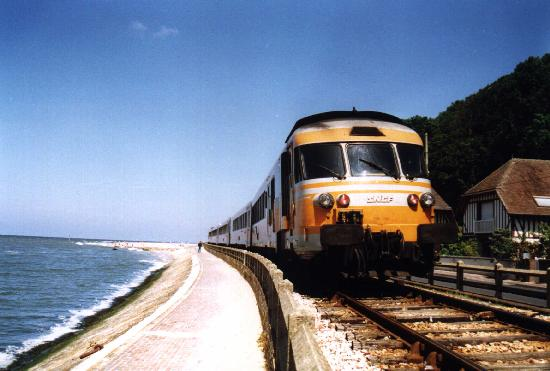
SNCF's turbotrain in Houlgate on the Deauville-Dives line

The Turbotrain is one of several French high-speed, gas-turbine trains. The earliest Turbotrain entered service in 1967, for use on France's SNCF intercity lines. There were four versions in total, with the last exiting service in 2005, and it is the Turbotrain that made advances possible for the TGV.

== TGS (Turbine à gaz spéciale) Prototype – XR 8575 trainset ==
In 1967, the SNCF converted a two-car X 4300 Class diesel multiple unit train originally built by ANF Industrie (Ateliers Construction du Nord de la France), starting in 1963 (either train number X4375 or X4365), into the prototype experimental Turbotrain TGS (Turbine à gaz spéciale). The new gas-turbine engine was installed into the trailer car of this two-car set; the original diesel power car was fitted with a new cab but retained its original diesel motor and transmission.

Trials started on 25 April 1967. The TGS reached 252 km/h (157 mph) on 15 October 1971.

== Class T 1000 ETG (Élément à Turbine à Gaz) trains ==
This is the first-generation of production Turbotrains. These ETG (Elément à Turbine à Gaz) trains were four-carriage trainsets which each offered 188 seats and included one diesel engine and one gas-turbine engine. The gas-turbine engine was an 820 kW Turbomeca Turmo IIIF3 Voith hydraulic derived from a helicopter turbine and the diesel was a 320 kW Saurer SDHR diesel–mechanical. These trains reached 160 km/h (99 mph). The ETGs entered service in 1971 on the Paris–Caen–Cherbourg. A total of 14 of these four-car trainsets were manufactured from 1969 to 1972 by ANF. These trains were maintained at the Venissieux trainshed in Lyon for "many years" but were moved to the Lyon Vaise depot in the 1980s. Electrification of the Grenoble line caused some trainsets to be shifted to work in Clermont Ferrand and Metz.

== Class T 2000 RTG (Rame à Turbine à Gaz) trains ==
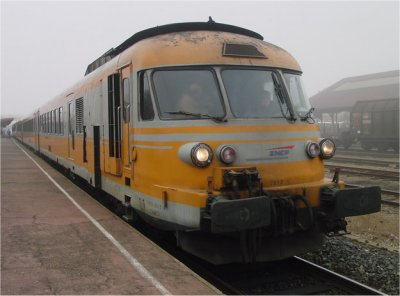
Turbotrain at Roanne

These trains each had five carriages, each with 280 seats, and were built between 1972 and 1976 by ANF and MTE (Societe de Materiel de Traction Electrique). Forty-one RTG trainsets were manufactured for SNCF service. These trains were equipped with one 820 kW (1,100 hp) Turmo IIIF1 gas turbine in each even-numbered cab and one Turmo XII 1,200 kW (1,600 hp) gas turbine in each odd-numbered cab, reaching 160 km/h (99 mph). Normally, the even-numbered 820 kW (1,100 hp) engine was shut down once the train reached cruising speeds. The RTG entered service in 1973 on the Strasbourg–Lyon and Lyon–Nantes lines; it subsequently entered service on the Paris–Caen–Cherbourg and Paris–Deauville–Dives-Cabourg lines in 1975. The electrification of the Paris–Caen–Cherbourg line in 1996 moved the RTGs onto the Lyon–Bordeaux line until 2005.

In later years, the SNCF RTG trainsets were modified to allow two RTG trains to be operated together by one driver as a multiple-unit train.

== Export models ==
Six examples of the RTG were built by ANF for Amtrak and were dubbed Turboliners in the United States. These RTG Turboliners were first imported to the United States in 1973 and "impressed with their reliability" and proliferated with further orders from France and licensed production in the United States by Rohr.

The Egyptian National Railways purchased three enlarged ten-car Turbotrains manufactured by ANF for a planned 160 km/h (99 mph) service on the 208 km route between Cairo and Alexandria. However, the trackage is not suitable for such speeds, and the trains have been restricted to 140 km/h (87 mph) maximum and 60 km/h (37 mph) in the vicinity of Cairo.

Four units of Turbotrains were introduced in Iran in 1974 with maximum speed of 160 km/h (99 mph) between Tehran and Mashhad. Later in 2008 these were converted to diesel multiple units.

== TGV 001 experimental high-speed train ==
This experimental Turbotrain TGV 001 set the world speed record of 318 km/h (198 mph) for gas-turbine–powered rail vehicles on 8 December 1972.

This TGV 001 was a five-car trainset which included four gas-turbine engines with a total output of 6,500 hp (4,800 kW) and all axles driven. This train was extensively tested over more than 34,000 miles (55,000 km) running at over 200 km/h (120 mph), of which almost half were covered at more than 257 km/h (160 mph), reaching a maximum of 318 km/h (198 mph). The research from this prototype, and from the Z7001 Zebulon electric test train, provided data used for the design of the later electric TGV trains.

The TGV 001 prototype was retired in January 1978; one power car from this trainset, TDu 001, is preserved and is located at 48.614729°N 7.727189°E, on the A4 highway at exit 50, Bischheim, near Strasbourg, in Alsace, France. The other power car (TDu 002) is preserved and located at 47.643008°N 6.889863°E, on the A36 highway at exit 13 (Belfort-Glacis du Château), near Belfort, in the Territoire de Belfort, France.

== Preservation ==
One RTG is kept in running condition at the French National Railway Museum in Mulhouse.

== See also ==
- Gas-turbine–electric locomotive
- SNCF
- Turbine–electric powertrain
- Turboshaft
