= Gas-turbine locomotive =

Type of railway locomotive

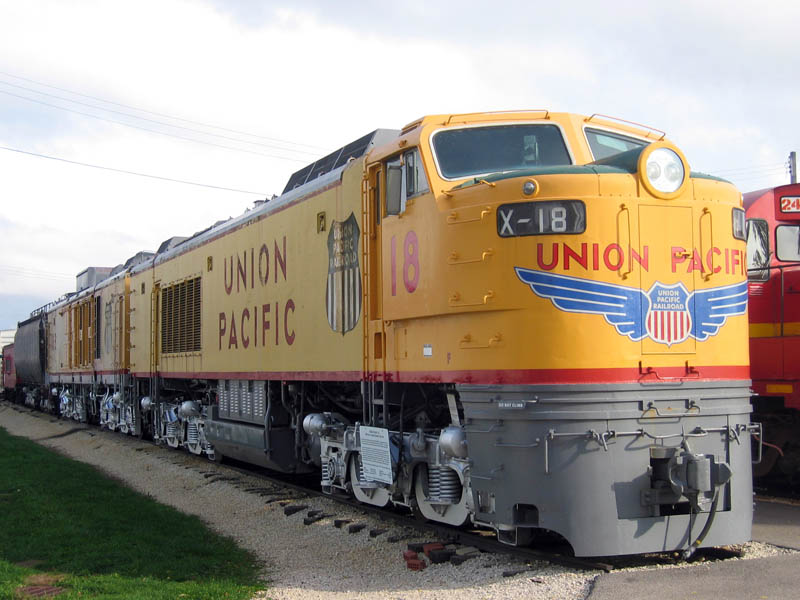
- UP 18, a gas-turbine–electric locomotive preserved at the Illinois Railway Museum
- Classification: Vehicle
- Application: Rail transport
- Fuel source: Fuel oil LNG; CNG; Coal (experimental)
- Powered: Yes
- Self-propelled: Yes

A gas-turbine locomotive is a type of railway locomotive powered by a gas-turbine engine, using either hydraulic, mechanical or electrical transmission. The term has also been applied to a small number of hybrid designs in which diesel engine exhaust gases drive a gas turbine which is coupled to the driving wheels.

The first locomotive to employ a gas turbine engine was completed in Switzerland in 1941 by Brown, Boveri & Cie who had already built the world’s first industrial gas turbine in 1939. By 1947, twelve gas-turbine engined locomotives were being designed in Switzerland, France, the United Kingdom, and the United States.

During the mid 20th century, gas turbine engines were seen as a viable alternative to diesel engines, whose reciprocating design limited power-to-weight ratios. Gas turbine engines generate power using high-speed rotating machinery instead of reciprocating pistons, resulting in a lighter and more compact power plant. Ultimately high fuel consumption prevented widespread adoption with diesel and electric locomotives proving more practical and economical.

== Hybrid designs using diesel engines ==
Historically the term "gas turbine locomotive" has been applied to a small number of hybrid designs in which a diesel-engine's exhaust gases are used to drive a gas turbine which is mechanically coupled to the driving wheels.

=== Sweden ===
The Swedish firm Götaverken had started investigating gas generator concepts, where a reciprocating engine’s exhaust would drive a gas turbine, as early as 1923. The fundamental principles and pioneering patents were developed by Erik Johansson, who led gas-generator development at the company until 1959. The first experimental unit was built in 1926, followed by installations in three ships.

In 1933 an existing locomotive was rebuilt at the Götaverken works with a crank-piston gas generator. The gas generator consisted of a four-cylinder, two-stroke diesel engine directly coupled to a two-cylinder reciprocating air compressor. There was a single crankshaft connected to both upper and lower pistons. The exhaust from the diesel engine powered the gas turbine, which drove the wheels through reversible reduction gearing. The locomotive was in use till 1937 after which it was scrapped with its gas generator being reused to power a tugboat.

After the World War II, the Swedish State Railways sought a diesel locomotive for lightly trafficked routes where electrification was uneconomic. Existing designs were too heavy for these secondary lines, so Götaverken developed a new gas-generator engine for a locomotive built by Motala Verkstad. Designated T1, it combined a two-stroke opposed-piston diesel engine with reciprocating compressors and a gas turbine driven by engine exhaust gasses. The locomotive was ordered in 1950, and following shop and field trials it entered regular service in 1955.

=== France ===
Diagram of a free-piston engine as a gas generator for a gas turbine

In 1952, Renault built a 1,000 hp (0.75 MW) Class 040-GA-1 turbine locomotive using a Pescara free-piston engine as a gas generator. It was followed by two further locomotives, Class 060-GA-1 of 2,400 hp (1.8 MW) in 1959–61.

The Pescara gas generator in 040-GA-1 consisted of a horizontal, single cylinder, two-stroke diesel engine with opposed pistons. It had no crankshaft and the pistons were returned after each power stroke by compression and expansion of air in a separate cylinder. The exhaust from the diesel engine powered the gas-turbine, which drove the wheels through a two-speed gearbox and propeller shafts.

=== Soviet Union ===
A free piston gas-turbine–hydraulic freight locomotive designated as type GT101 was developed and produced in 1960 by the Luhansk Locomotive Works. It was intended to consist of two sections of a C-C wheel arrangement, but only one section was built. This section was equipped with four free piston gas generators and gas turbine with a maximum power output of 2,200 kW (3,000 hp), and a hydraulic transmission. The locomotive did not enter revenue service.

=== Examples ===
Examples of hybrid diesel engined gas-turbine–mechanical locomotives:

- 1933 Götaverken, 1-B-1, Sweden, 300 hp (220 kW)
- 1952 Renault, France, B-B, 1,000 hp (750 kW)
- 1954 Götaverken, Sweden, 1-C-1, 1,300 hp (970 kW)
- 1960 Luhansk Locomotive Works, GT101, 2,200 kW (3,000 hp)

== Gas-turbine–electric ==
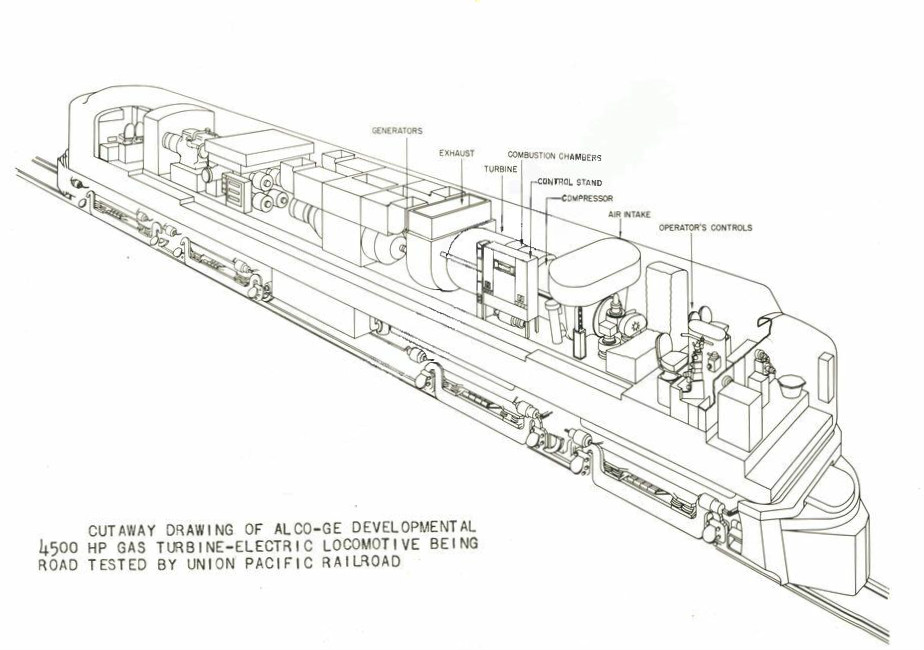
Diagram of a gas-turbine–electric locomotive

A gas-turbine–electric locomotive (GTEL) is a locomotive that uses a gas turbine engine to drive an electric generator or alternator, producing an electric current which is used to power traction motors. This type of locomotive was first introduced in Switzerland during the 1940s and by 1947, twelve gas-turbine electric locomotives were being designed in Switzerland, France, the United Kingdom, and the United States. Few locomotives use this system today.

A GTEL uses a turbo–electric drivetrain in which a turboshaft engine drives the electric generator or alternator via a system of gears. The electric current is distributed to power the traction motors that drive the locomotive. In overall terms the system is very similar to a conventional diesel–electric, with the large diesel engine replaced with a smaller gas turbine of similar power.

Union Pacific operated the largest fleet of such locomotives of any railroad in the world, and was the only railroad to use them for hauling freight. Most other GTELs have been built for small passenger trains, and only a few have seen any real success in that role. With a rise in fuel costs (eventually leading to the 1973 oil crisis), gas-turbine locomotives became uneconomical to operate, and many were taken out of service. Union Pacific's locomotives also required more maintenance than originally anticipated, due to fouling of the turbine blades by the Bunker C oil used as fuel.

=== Switzerland ===
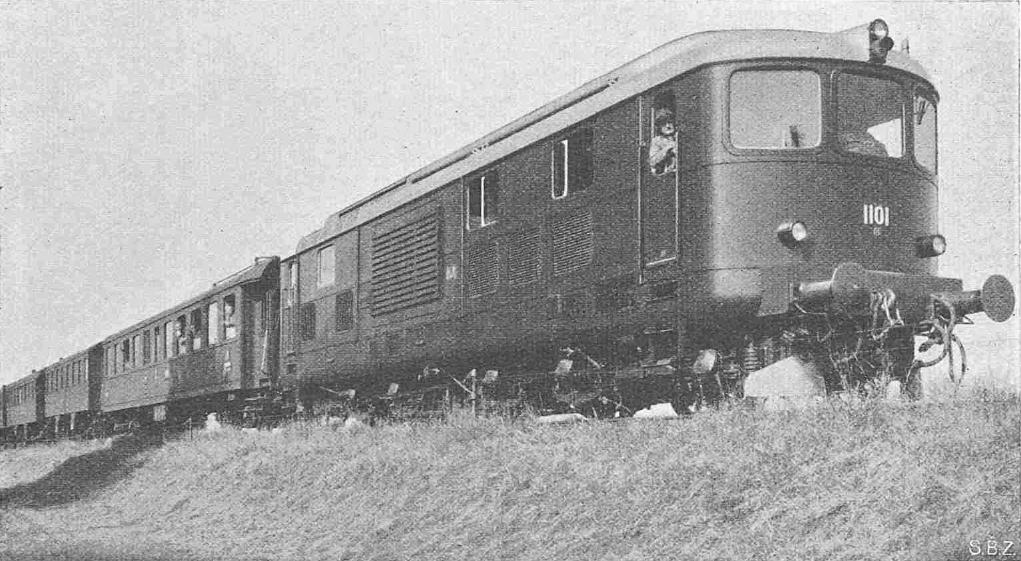
1942 publicity photo of Am 4/6 number 1101

The first gas turbine locomotive to employ the Brayton cycle used in modern gas turbines and jet engines was completed in Switzerland in 1941 by Brown, Boveri & Cie who had already built the world’s first industrial gas turbine in 1939. The locomotive was built for the Swiss Federal Railways and was intended to serve non electrified branch lines where there were weight restrictions. The locomotive employed an axial-flow compressor and turbine mounted on a single shaft, driving the wheels through an electric transmission.

=== United Kingdom ===
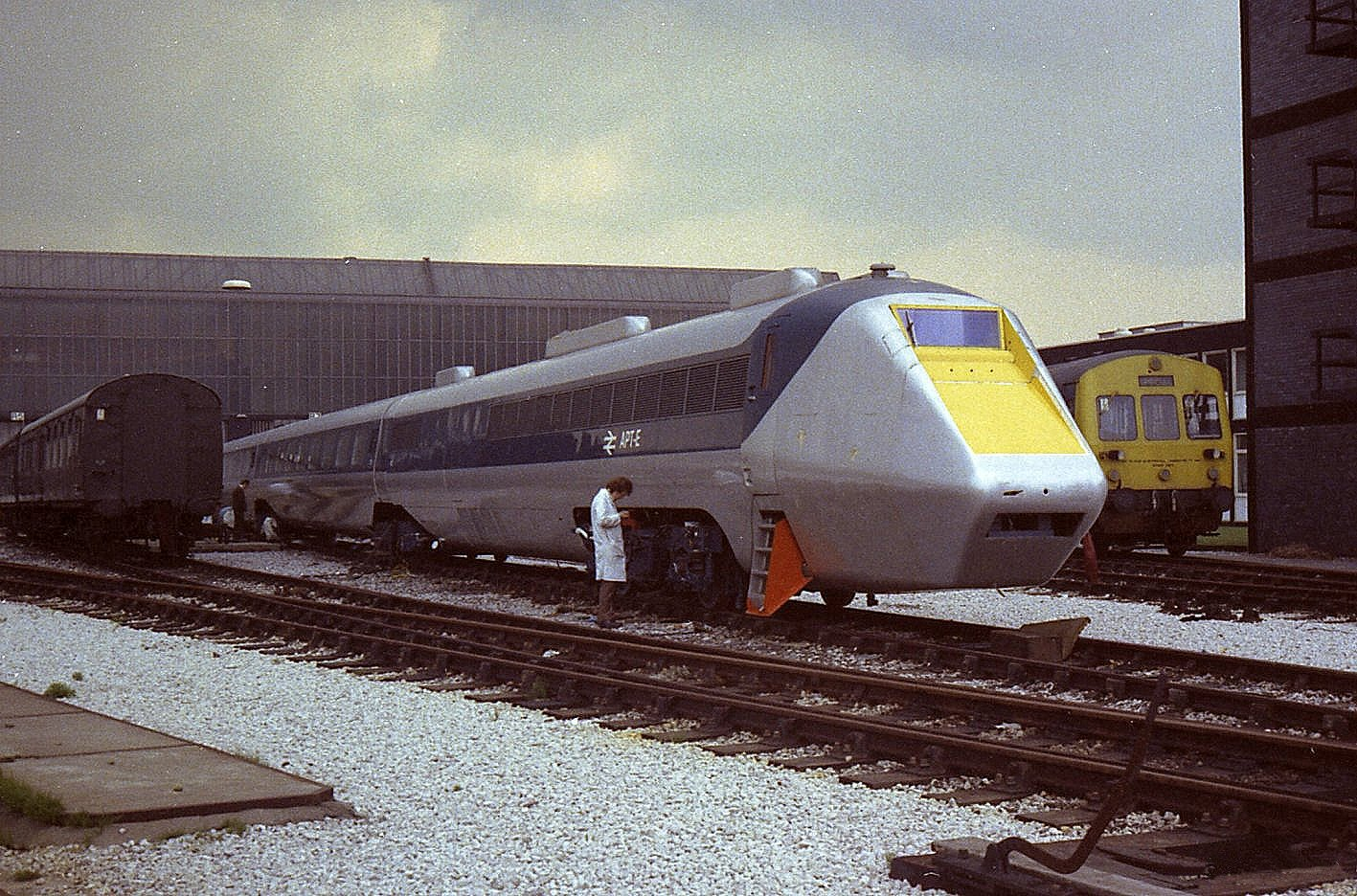
British Rail APT-E, Derby, UK, 1972

Two gas-turbine locomotives of different design, 18000 and 18100, were ordered by the Great Western Railway (GWR) but completed for the newly nationalised British Railways.

British Rail 18000 was built by Brown Boveri and delivered in 1949. It was a 1840 kW (2470 hp) GTEL, ordered by the GWR and used for express passenger services.

British Rail 18100 was built by Metropolitan-Vickers and delivered in 1951. It had an aircraft-type gas turbine of 2.2 MW (3,000 hp). Its maximum speed was 90 miles per hour (140 km/h).

A third locomotive, the GT3, was constructed in 1961. Although built by English Electric, who had pioneered electric transmission with LMS 10000 locomotives, this used a turbine–mechanical transmission.

The British Rail APT-E, the prototype of the Advanced Passenger Train, was turbine-powered. Like the French TGV, later models used an alternative electric powertrain. This choice was made because British Leyland, the turbine supplier, ceased production of the model used in the APT-E, having lost interest in gas-turbine technology following the 1970s oil crisis.

=== United States ===
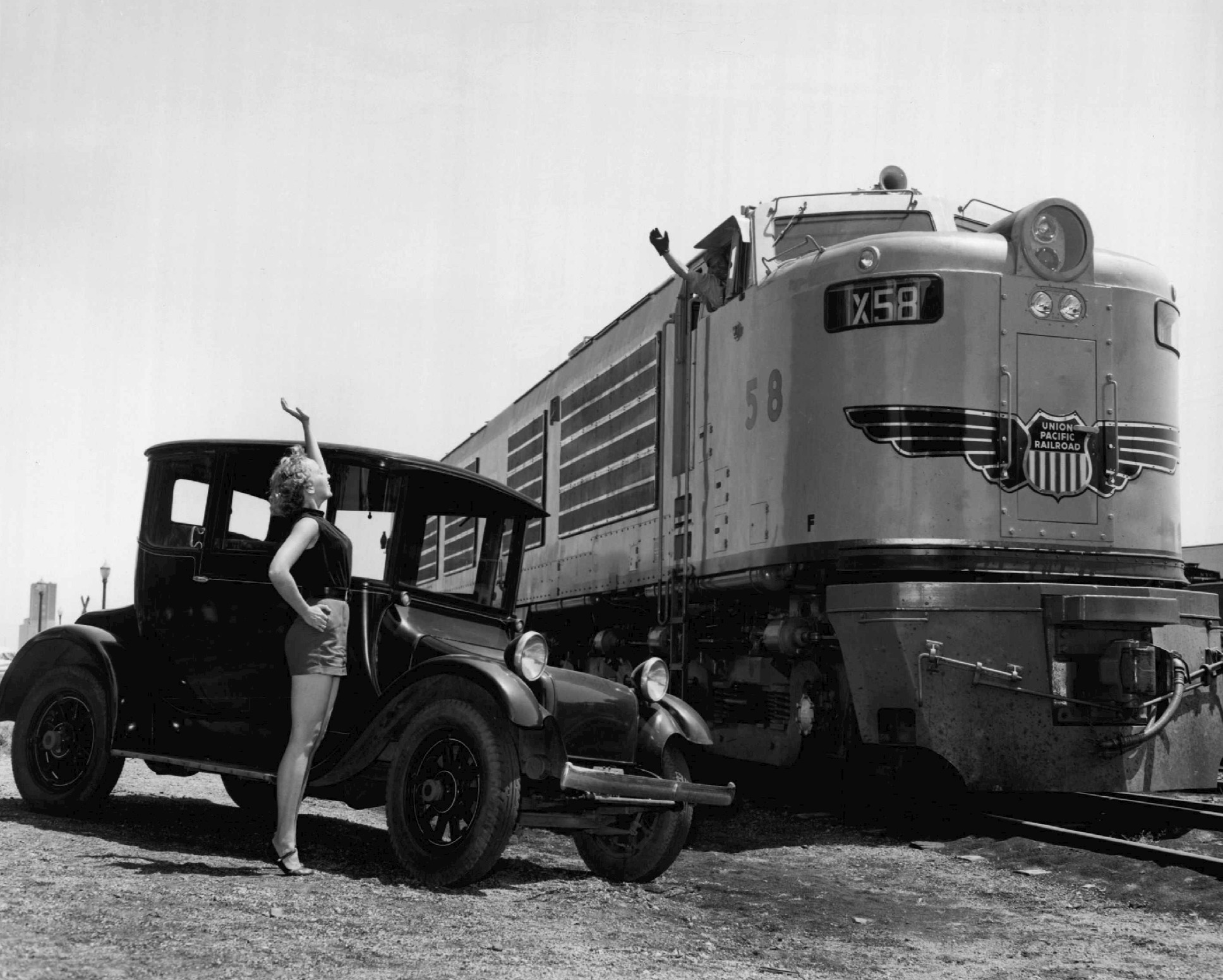
First-generation GTEL and a 1923 electric auto in Fremont, Nebraska in 1953

ALCO-GE built a prototype oil-fired gas-turbine–electric locomotive in 1948, with a B-B-B-B wheel arrangement. After demonstration runs it was acquired by Union Pacific, who were seeking a more powerful alternative to diesel for transcontinental trains.

UP ran a fleet of 55 turbine-powered freight locomotives starting in the early 1950s, all produced by Alco-GE. The first- and second-generation versions shared the same wheel arrangement as the prototype; the third-generation version were C-C types. All were widely used on long-haul routes, and were cost-effective despite their poor fuel economy, due to their use of "leftover" fuels from the petroleum industry. At their height the railroad estimated that they powered about 10% of Union Pacific's freight trains, a much wider use than any other example of this class. As other uses were found for these heavier petroleum byproducts, notably for plastics, the cost of the Bunker C fuel increased until the units became too expensive to operate and they were retired from service by 1969.

In April 1950, Baldwin and Westinghouse completed an experimental 4,000 hp (3,000 kW) turbine locomotive, #4000, known as the Blue Goose, also using the B-B-B-B wheel arrangement. The locomotive used two 2,000 hp (1,500 kW) turbine engines, was equipped for passenger train heating with a steam generator that utilized the waste exhaust heat of the right hand turbine, and was geared for 100 miles per hour (160 km/h). While it was demonstrated successfully in both freight and passenger service on the PRR, MKT, and CNW, no production orders followed, and it was scrapped in 1953.

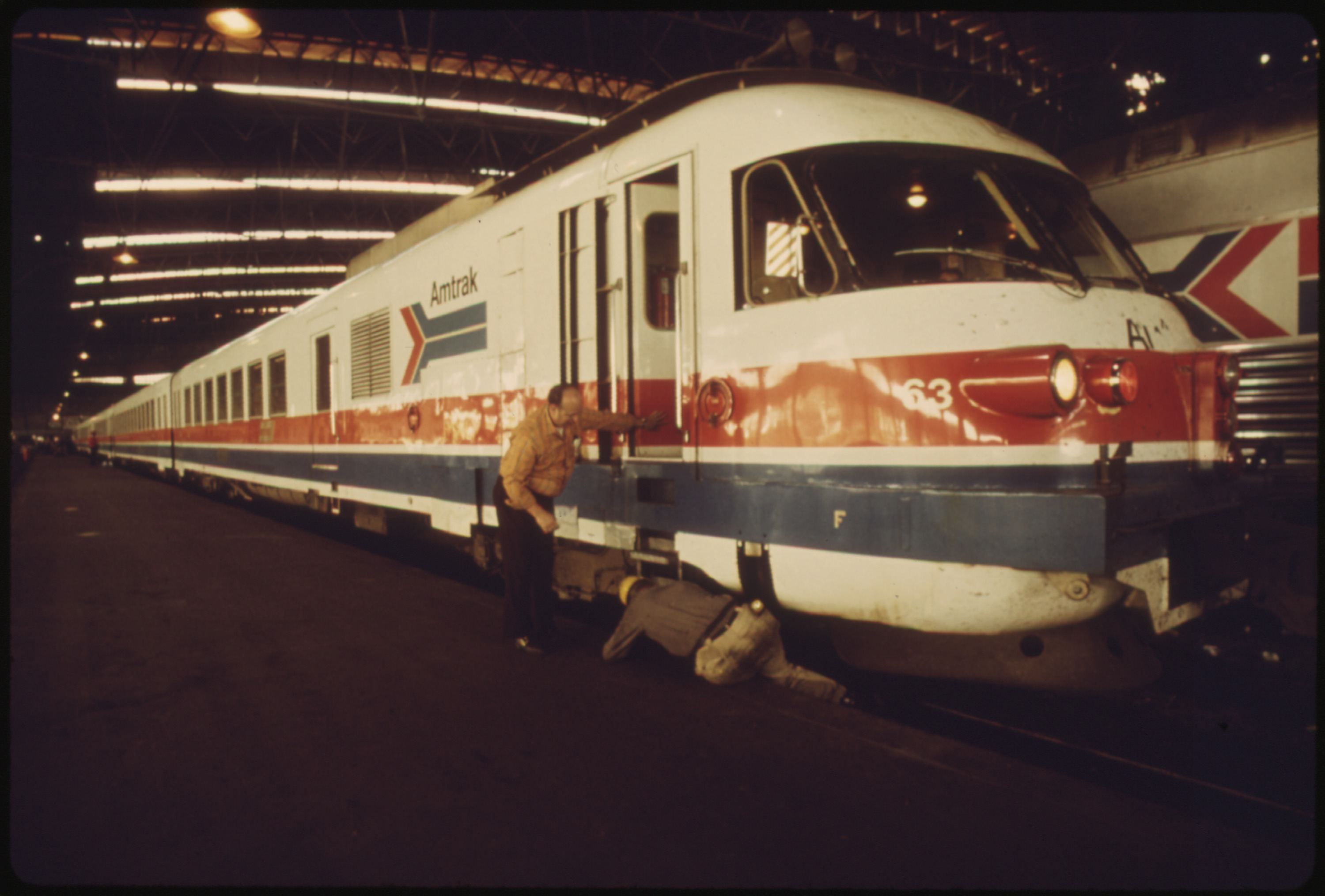
An RTG Turboliner at Union Station, St. Louis, in the 1970s

In the 1960s United Aircraft built the TurboTrain passenger train, which was tested by the Pennsylvania Railroad and later used by Amtrak and Via Rail. The Via remained in service into the 1980s and had an excellent maintenance record during this period, but was eventually replaced by the LRC in 1982. Amtrak purchased two different types of turbine-powered trainsets, which were both called Turboliners. The sets of the first type were similar in appearance to SNCF's T 2000 Turbotrain, though compliance with FRA safety regulations made them heavier and slower than the French trains. None of the first-type Turboliners remain in service. Amtrak also added a number of similarly named Rohr Turboliners (or RTL) to its roster. There were plans to rebuild these as RTL IIIs, but this program was cancelled. The units owned by New York State were sold for scrap and the three remaining RTL trainsets are stored at North Brunswick, New Jersey and New Haven, Connecticut.

In 1966, the Long Island Rail Road tested an experimental gas-turbine railcar (numbered GT-1), powered by two Garrett turbine engines. This car was based on a Budd Pioneer III design, with transmissions similar to Budd's 1950s-era RDCs. The car was later modified (as GT-2) to add the ability to run on electric third rail as well.

In 1977, the LIRR tested eight more gas-turbine–electric/electric dual-mode railcars, in an experiment sponsored by the USDOT. Four of these cars had GE-designed powertrains, while the other four had powertrains designed by Garrett (four more cars had been ordered with GM/Allison powertrains, but were canceled). These cars were similar to LIRR's M1 EMU cars in appearance, with the addition of step wells for loading from low level platforms. The cars suffered from poor fuel economy and mechanical problems, and were withdrawn from service after a short period of time. The four GE-powered cars were converted to M1 EMUs and the Garrett cars were scrapped.

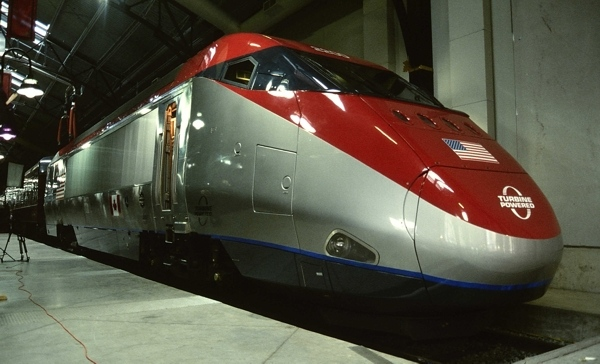
Bombardier's experimental JetTrain locomotive toured North America in an attempt to raise the technology's public profile in the early 2000s.

In 1997 the Federal Railroad Administration (FRA) solicited proposals to develop high speed locomotives for routes outside the Northeast Corridor where electrification was not economical. Bombardier Ltd, at the Plattsburg, N.Y. plant where the Acela was produced, developed a prototype (JetTrain) which combined a Pratt & Whitney Canada PW100 gas turbine and a diesel engine with a single gearbox powering four traction motors identical to those in Acela. The diesel provided head end power and low speed traction, with the turbine not being started until after leaving stations. The prototype was completed in June 2000, and safety testing was done at the FRA's Pueblo, CO test track beginning in the summer of 2001. A maximum speed of 156 miles per hour (251 km/h) was reached. The prototype was then taken on a tour of potential sites for high speed service, but no service has yet begun.

=== Russia ===
Two gas-turbine–electric locomotive types underwent testing in the Soviet Union. The test program began in 1959 and lasted into the early 1970s. The G1-01 freight GTEL, produced by Kolomna Locomotive Works, was intended to consist of two locomotives of a C-C wheel arrangement, but only one section was built. The GP1 passenger locomotive was a similar design with body of TEP60 diesel locomotive, also with a C-C wheel arrangement, introduced to the test program in 1964. Two units were built by Kolomna Works, GP1-0001 and GP1-0002, which were also used in regular service with passenger trains. Both types had a maximum power output of 2,600 kW (3,500 hp).

In 2006, Russian Railways introduced the GEM-10 switcher GTEL. The turbine runs on liquefied natural gas (LNG) and has a maximum power output of 1,000 kW (1,300 hp). The GEM-10 has a C-C wheel arrangement. The TGEM10-0001, which uses the same turbine and fuel as the GEM-10, is a two-unit (cow–calf) switcher GTEL with a B-B+B-B wheel arrangement. The slave unit of this locomotive is used as a fuel tender with compressed natural gas (CNG) and does not have a prime mover, so its traction motors are powered by the main section. The turbine of this locomotive also has a maximum power output of 1,000 kW (1,300 hp).

GT1h-001 during a test ride

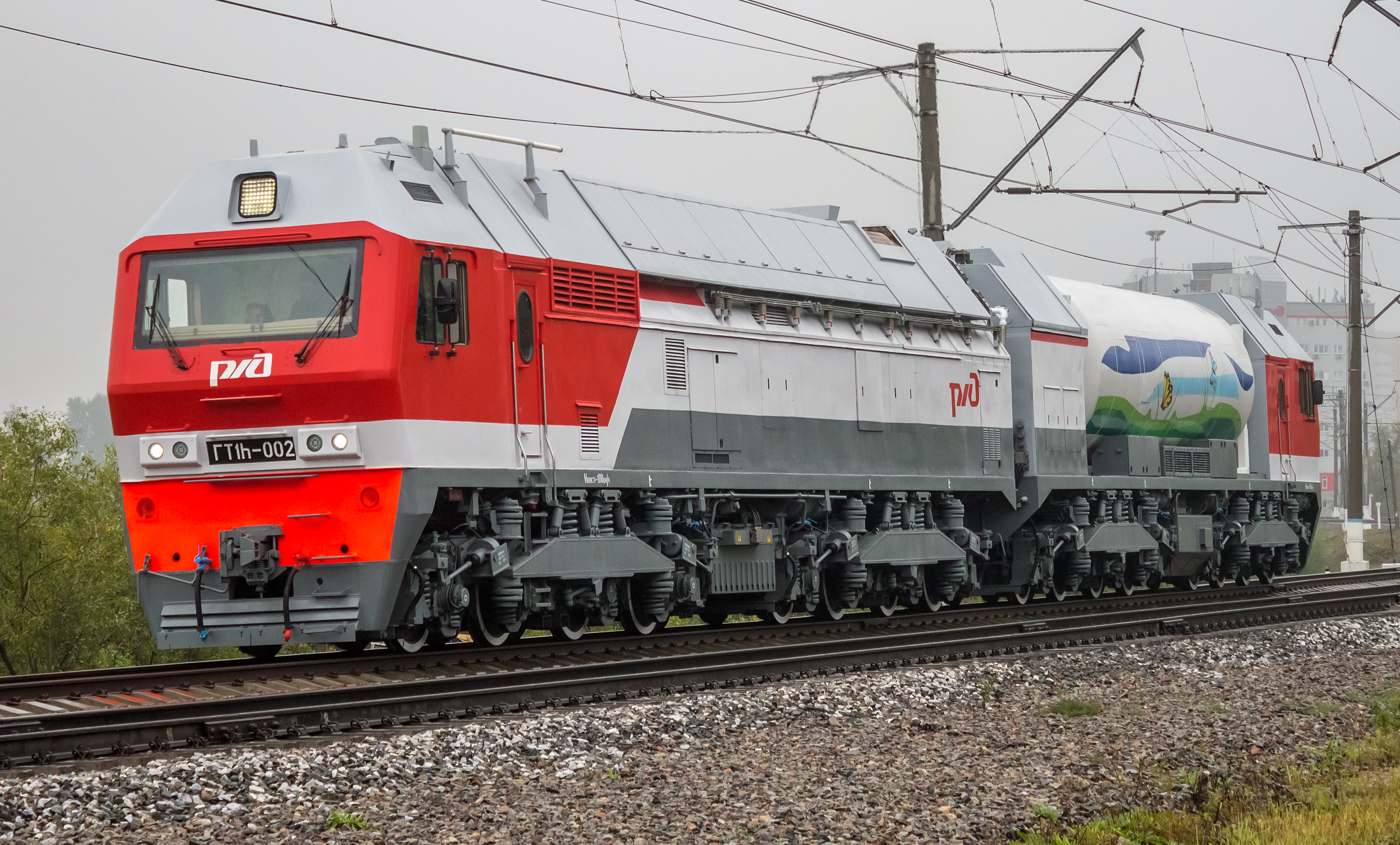
GT1h-002

The GT1-001 freight GTEL, rebuilt from a VL15 electric locomotive in 2006 and introduced in 2007, runs on LNG and has a maximum power output of 8,300 kW (11,100 hp). One section carries the LNG tank and the other houses the turbine with electric power generation, and both sections have traction motors and cabs. The locomotive has a B-B-B+B-B-B wheel arrangement, and up to three GT1 locomotives can be coupled together. On 23 January 2009, the GT1-001 conducted a test run with a 159-car train weighing 15,000 metric tons (14,800 long tons; 16,500 short tons); further heavy-haul tests were carried out in December 2010. In a test run conducted in September 2011, the locomotive pulled 170 freight cars weighing 16,000 metric tons (15,700 long tons; 17,600 short tons). In 2012, the helper diesel engine used for shunting operations was replaced with an accumulator, and the locomotive was renamed to GT1h (where 'h' stands for hybrid). The GT1h-001 remained a prototype and never went into production.

The GT1h-001's successor is the GT1h-002. Despite the same type designation, this locomotive has a fundamentally different design with a (B-B)-(B-B)+(B-B)-(B-B) wheel arrangement, derived from the TEM7 diesel shunting locomotive, and the new body with open LNG tank, derived from the body of the 2ES6 electric locomotive. This serial type has a maximum power output of 8,500 kW (11,400 hp). Both GT1h locomotives are in operation in Egorshino in the Ural region.

=== Canada ===
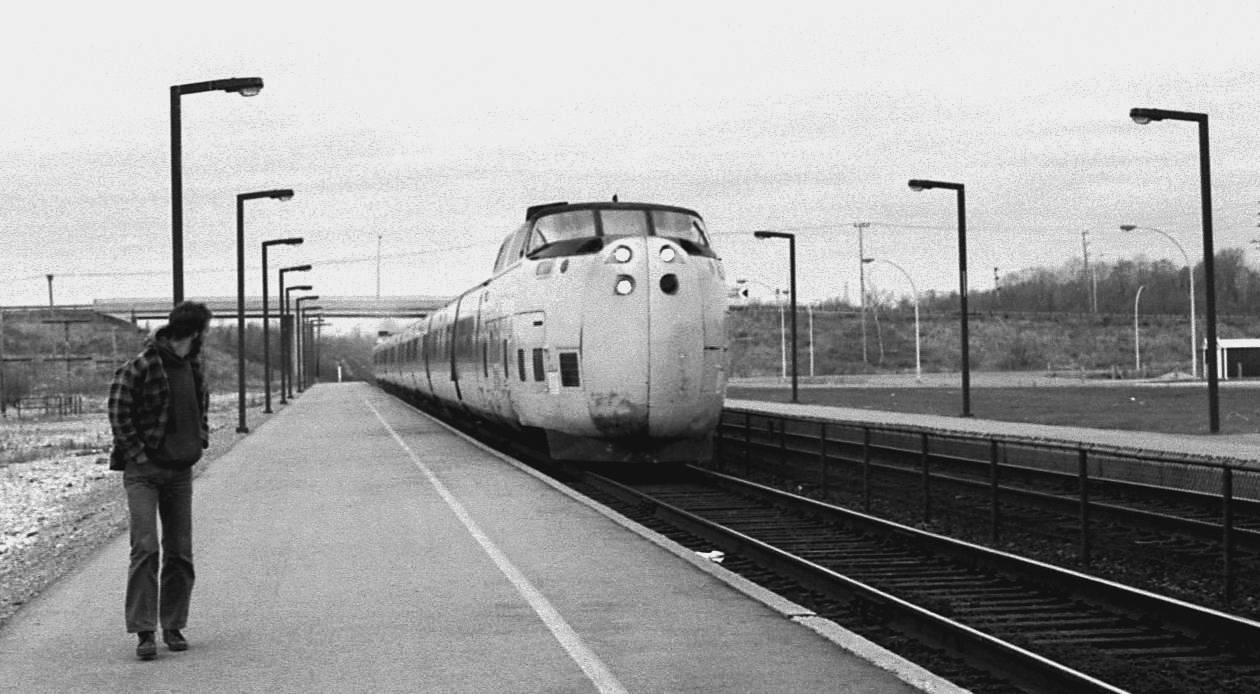
The Turbo Train at Kingston, Ontario, Canada

Canadian National Railways (CN) was one of the operators of the Turbo, which were passed on to Via Rail. They operated on the major Toronto–Montreal route between 1968 and 1982, when they were replaced by the LRC.

In 2002, Bombardier Transportation announced the launch of the JetTrain, a high-speed trainset consisting of tilting carriages and a locomotive powered by a Pratt & Whitney turboshaft engine. Proposals were made to use the trains for Quebec City–Windsor, Orlando–Miami, and in Alberta, Texas, Nevada and the UK. One prototype was built and tested, but no JetTrains have yet been sold for service. However, nothing ever came of any of these proposals, and the JetTrain essentially disappeared, being superseded by the Bombardier Zefiro line of conventionally powered high speed and very high speed trains. The JetTrain no longer appears on any of Bombardier's current web sites or promotional materials, although it can still be found on older web sites bearing the Canadair logos.

=== France ===
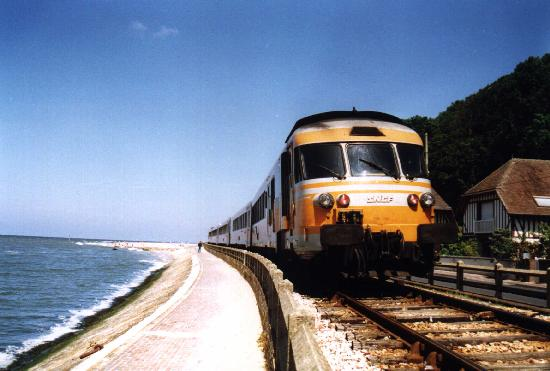
SNCF's Turbotrain in Houlgate, on the Deauville–Dives railway line, 1989

The first TGV prototype, TGV 001, was powered by a gas turbine, but steep oil prices prompted the change to overhead electric lines for power delivery. However, two large classes of gas-turbine powered intercity railcars were constructed in the early 1970s (ETG and RTG) and were used extensively up to about 2000.

SNCF (French National Railways) used a number of gas-turbine trainsets, called the Turbotrain, in non-electrified territory. These typically consisted of a power car at each end with three cars between them. Turbotrain was in use up until 2005. After retirement, four sets were sold for further use in Iran.

== Gas-turbine–mechanical ==
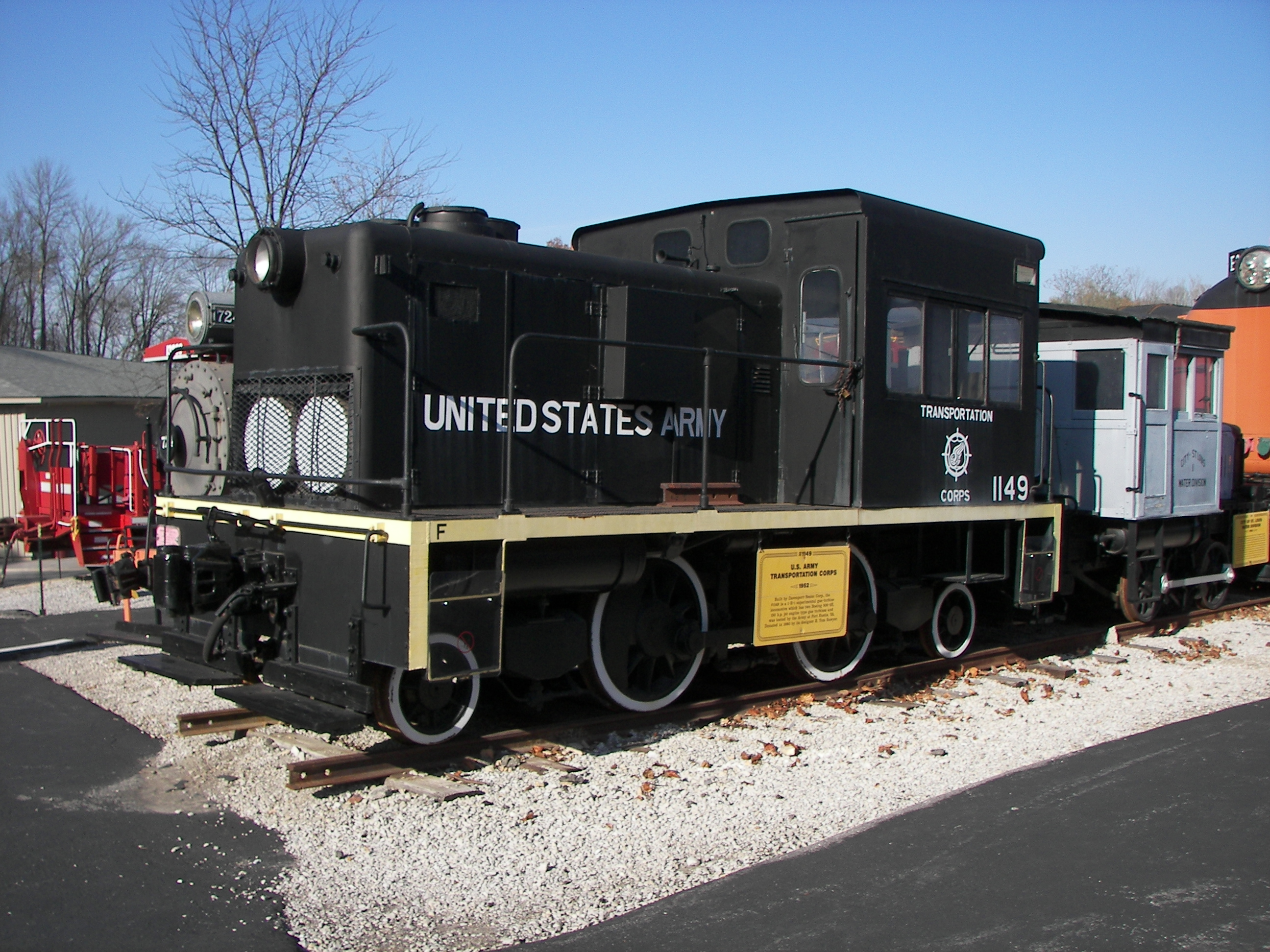
A 44-ton 1-B-1 experimental gas-turbine locomotive designed by R. Tom Sawyer and built in 1952 for testing by the U.S. Army Transportation Corps

Gas-turbine–mechanical locomotives use a mechanical transmission to deliver the power output of gas turbine engines to the wheels.

=== United States ===
In 1954, the Davenport Locomotive Works completed a small 300 hp (220 kW) shunting locomotive for the U.S. Army. This was the first railway locomotive to use aeroderivative gas turbines. It was powered by two Boeing 502-2E engines and featured a three-speed mechanical transmission.

=== Czechoslovakia ===
Turbine power was considered for railway traction in the former Czechoslovakia. Two turbine-powered prototypes were built, designated TL 659.001 and TL 659.002, featuring C-C wheel arrangement, 3,200 hp (2.4 MW) main turbine, helper turbine and Tatra 111 helper diesel engine.

The first prototype (TL 659.001) was finished in February 1958 and was scheduled to be exhibited at Expo '58. However, this was aborted because it was not ready in time. The first out-of-factory tests were conducted in March 1959 on the Plzeň–Cheb–Sokolov line. On 15 May 1959, the first prototype pulled its heaviest train, 6,486 t (7,150 short tons), but the turbine caught fire only a day later. The engine was never restored and eventually scrapped.

The second prototype (TL 659.002) was built with lessons learned from the first. It left the factory in March 1960 and was the only turbine locomotive to pass the tests for regular service on tracks of the former Czechoslovak State Railways. It was tried near Kolín and Plzeň with mixed results. This engine was taken out of service in April 1966 and sold to the University of Žilina as an educational instrument. It was scrapped some time later.

Although the experiments had mixed results, these were the most powerful locomotives with a purely mechanical powertrain in the world and also the most powerful independent-traction locomotives in Czechoslovakia.

=== United Kingdom ===
The British Rail GT3 was a simple machine consisting essentially of a standard oil-fired gas turbine mounted on a standard steam locomotive chassis, built as a demonstrator by English Electric in 1961. Its almost crude simplicity enabled it to avoid much of the unreliability which had plagued the complex experimental gas-turbine–electric locomotives 18000 and 18100 in earlier years, but it failed to be competitive against conventional traction and was scrapped.

=== Examples ===
Examples of gas-turbine–mechanical locomotives:

- 1952 Davenport-Bessler Corp., 1-B-1, United States, 300 hp (220 kW) (designed by R. Tom Sawyer)
- 1958 Renault, France, C-C, 2,000 hp (1,500 kW)
- 1958 Škoda, C-C, Czechoslovakia, 3,200 hp (2,400 kW)
- 1959 British Rail GT3, 2'C, 2,700 hp (2,000 kW)

== Coal-firing ==
=== US experiments with pulverized-coal ===
By the mid-1940s, the growing success of diesel locomotives threatened the long-standing relationship between American coal producers and coal-hauling railroads. In response, eight major railroads and four coal companies formed the Locomotive Development Committee (LDC) to develop a more economical coal-burning locomotive. In 1945, the LDC's Mechanical Advisory Group formally recommended the development of a gas-turbine locomotive burning pulverized-coal. Although it was recognised that a gas turbine would not match the thermal efficiency of a diesel engine, proponents argued that the low cost of coal offered a substantial economic advantage.

As part of the LDC's development program experimental test rigs were built by Alco in 1946 and Westinghouse in 1947 however the technical challenges of pulverized-coal combustion and ash separation proved far greater than anticipated. By 1955, tests indicated fuel costs up to 64% lower than those of diesel-electric locomotives. Although the concept had been demonstrated by 1959, it never advanced beyond experimental locomotive development. No examples entered regular revenue service, as diesel-electric traction had already become firmly established and offered greater practicality and reliability.

=== Indirect-fired coal-burning gas turbines ===
Following the Second World War, several countries explored indirect-fired coal-burning gas turbines. In Britain, the North British Locomotive Company and the Parsons Steam Turbine Company developed a design in which coal was burned in a furnace and the resulting heat transferred to compressed air in a large air heater; the clean heated air then drove a turbine, avoiding the passage of abrasive coal ash. A similar concept was pursued in the Soviet Union for a 3,000 hp (2,200 kW) locomotive, using an air heater between the compressor and turbine and recirculating turbine exhaust to support combustion. In Canada, researchers at McGill University investigated a related system employing two heat exchangers to warm compressed air before it entered the turbine, with provision for bypassing the combustion chamber to assist temperature control. None of these projects produced a working locomotive.

== See also ==
- Turbojet train
- Combined cycle powered railway locomotive

== Sources ==
- UP: Gas Turbine Locomotives
- Gas Turbine locomotive FAQ
- Gas turbines FAQ – NE Rails
- Union Pacific story 1934–1982 part 3
- Locomotive Engineers Journal; July, 1949
- GT1-001 – the 23 January 2009 test run (in Russian)
