= British Rail GT3 =

Gas turbine locomotive built by English Electric

GT3
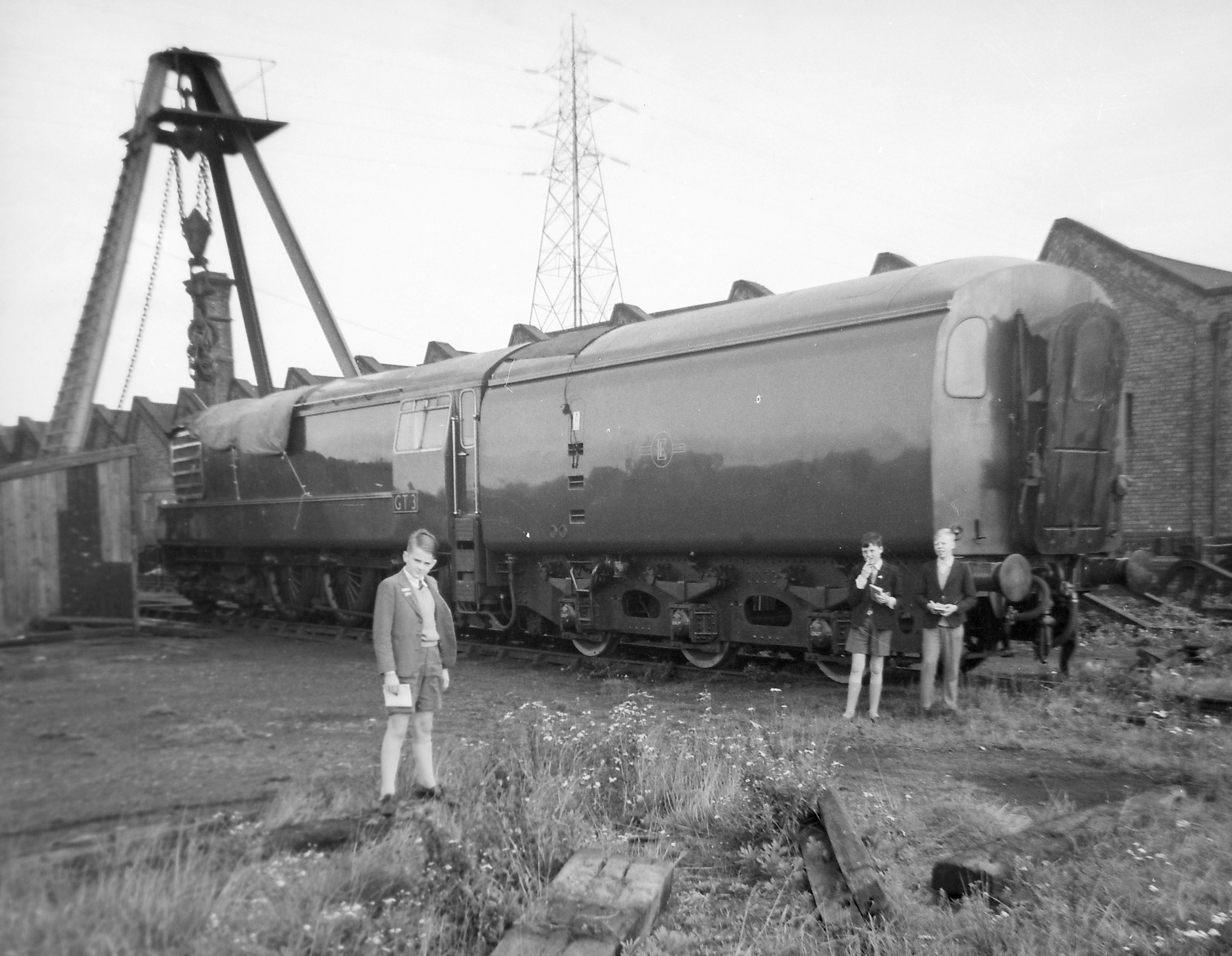
- GT3 at Leicester, 1961
Type and origin
- Power type: Gas Turbine mechanical
- Builder: English Electric at Vulcan Foundry
- Serial number: Vulcan Foundry: D228
- Build date: 1958–1961
Specifications
- Configuration
  - Whyte: 4-6-0
  - UIC: 2'C
- Driver dia.: 5 ft 9 in (1.753 m)
- Length: 68 ft 0 1/2 in (20.74 m)
- Loco weight: 79.80 long tons (81.08 t; 89.38 short tons)
- Tender weight: 44 long tons (45 t; 49 short tons)
- Prime mover: EM27L
- Engine type: Gas turbine
- Transmission: Mechanical: flexible drive from gearbox onto middle driving axle
- Train heating: Steam generator
Performance figures
- Maximum speed: 90 mph (140 km/h)
- Power output: 2,750 hp (2,050 kW)
- Tractive effort: 38,000 lbf (169.03 kN)
Career
- Operators: British Rail
- Numbers: GT3
- Disposition: Scrapped in February 1966

GT3 (Gas Turbine 3) was a one-off experimental prototype mainline gas turbine locomotive built in 1961 by English Electric at its Vulcan Foundry in Newton-le-Willows to investigate the use of its gas turbines in rail traction applications. It followed 18000 and 18100 as gas turbines 1 and 2. It was designed by English Electric engineer J. O. P. Hughes in a project that started in the early 1950s. Externally it resembled a steam tender locomotive, but the tender carried kerosene fuel. The designer said the traditional chassis and mechanical transmission avoided complications with (at the time of its conception) relatively untried technologies for bogies and electrical transmission.

== Overview ==
The National Railway Museum Archives hold the JOP Hughes papers which contain initial concept sketches for various 4-8-4 wheel arrangement single-unit configurations of the machine and early 4-6-0 tender locomotive drawings. These early concept drawings show various names, numbers and liveries, and were drawn with Boxpok-type wheels. The final design was for a 4-6-0 wheel arrangement locomotive with a fuel tender, looking much like a traditional steam locomotive in form.

As constructed the locomotive was built with bespoke heavy steel frames which not only bore the auxiliaries, combustion chamber, turbines, heat exchanger and locomotive cab, but also provided adhesive weight for the finished machine. The frames were carried by a leading two-axle outside-framed bogie and three main axles. The driving wheels were of conventional design in the finished locomotive and were of 5 feet 9 inches (1.75 m) diameter with 19 spokes and conventional balance weights. The centre axle mounted a mechanical transmission shaft driven from the turbine assembly, with power to the outer axles being transmitted by side rods. Power came from an English Electric EM27L gas turbine arrangement of 2,750 hp (2,050 kW) with high- and low-pressure turbines. The low-pressure turbine ran continuously in operation and was used to drive the locomotive's auxiliaries, with the high-pressure turbine operating as higher power outputs were required. Both the locomotive and its fuel tender were vacuum-braked, with vacuum brake ejectors being driven by air pressure bled from the turbine. The locomotive's other auxiliaries (housed in its leading end beneath the large side air intakes) were shaft- and belt-driven.

The tender was permanently coupled behind the locomotive and contained a Spanner train heating boiler at the leading end and fuel tanks either side of a central corridor with a boiler water tank beneath. A crew toilet compartment and British Standard corridor connection were located at the rear. The six-wheel chassis was based on then standard British Railways practice, albeit it with specially made and shaped side frames and bespoke tank and bodywork assembled at Vulcan Foundry. The locomotive had a designed maximum speed of 90 mph (140 km/h), weighed 123.5 long tons (125.5 t; 138.3 short tons), and was painted in a lined Beech Leaf Brown Livery, earning it the nickname The Chocolate Zephyr by railway enthusiasts. Underframes, grilles and the front access and cab doors were painted Brunswick Green with lettering and lining in Orange.

== Testing ==
The locomotive was taken to British Railways' Rugby test centre in an incomplete state for testing on rollers, and then on a short section of specially laid track. After returning to Vulcan Foundry for final assembly, the locomotive was then based at the former locomotive shed at Whitchurch in Shropshire for initial light testing and crew training on the Malpas line between Crewe and Chester, before commencing loaded test runs to Llandudno Junction. One of these runs was filmed from on board the locomotive by British Movietone News and the resulting film also showed the locomotive being turned on Llandudno Junction turntable. In the event not all of the planned North Wales Coast Line test runs were completed.

GT3 then moved to Leicester Shed on the Great Central Main Line line for testing and crew training between Leicester and Woodford Halse and then Leicester and Marylebone. Leicester was convenient for English Electric's Whetstone turbine works. During this period it was displayed at Marylebone for the 50th anniversary of the Institute of Locomotive Engineers. The event ran from 11 to 14 May 1961 and GT3 was filmed by British Pathé being inspected by the Duke of Edinburgh. Later testing was undertaken on the West Coast Main Line from Crewe over Shap Summit to Carlisle. On one of these runs Oswald Nock travelled on board and was able to both witness the locomotive in operation and record its performance, his log of the trip later appearing in The Railway Magazine's practice and performance feature for February 1962. Commenting on the testing the designer noted that, despite some of the expected teething troubles and modifications, once it had departed on a test run GT3 had never failed to complete its booked workings. The locomotive was described as being comfortable and easy to handle for the crew, with conversation at normal volumes possible in the fully enclosed cab.

== Demise ==
Despite returning favourable performances on longer runs requiring sustained power outputs, the prototype nature of the locomotive would have required further investigation and development into a configuration which would have matched the convenience of the new double-ended diesel-electric locomotives then being built. Neither English Electric or British Railways were prepared to fund this work as they were committed to diesel-electric locomotives.They were rapidly becoming the future of rail traction with ever-improving power-to-weight ratios.

Upon completion of the Shap test runs GT3 was returned to English Electric at Vulcan Foundry at the end of 1962 and stored. Following internal correspondence in September 1965 the locomotive was partially dismantled and its turbine and heat exchanger equipment removed. It was finally scrapped at Thos. W. Ward, Salford in February 1966 having been towed there by a Standard class steam locomotive.

== Surviving records ==
The most complete record of the locomotive is contained in the paper written by its designer in 1962 and in his papers now held at the National Railway Museum Archives in York. Much of what had been written about the locomotive was based on conjecture until these sources became available; subsequently an article in The Railway Magazine for December 2015 brought together an accurate and verifiable record of the locomotive. No detailed engineering drawings of the locomotives as built are thought to have survived, the York archive containing an internal memo instructing that these were to be returned to the Gas Turbine division of English Electric when dismantling commenced in 1965. Several articles with drawings have appeared in the railway modelling press since the locomotive was scrapped, but most appear to be based on a contemporary sectional view widely published at the time and are flawed with regard to details such as driving wheels (19-spoke), roof and side access hatches, cab rear, tender front and tender rear. The most accurate drawing appears to have been a contemporary "Skinley" drawing produced with the assistance of JOP Hughes. A copy resides with correspondence between Hughes and Skinley in the JOP Hughes papers at the National Railway Museum. In recent years a 5-inch (127 mm) gauge turbine powered model of the locomotive has been built and exhibited in the UK.

== Models ==
Canadian-based Model Railway manufacturer KR Models announced that would be creating a OO Scale model of the GT3 in its prototype brown livery in 2018, and the model was delivered in 2020.
