= British Rail 18100 =

Prototype main line gas turbine–electric locomotive

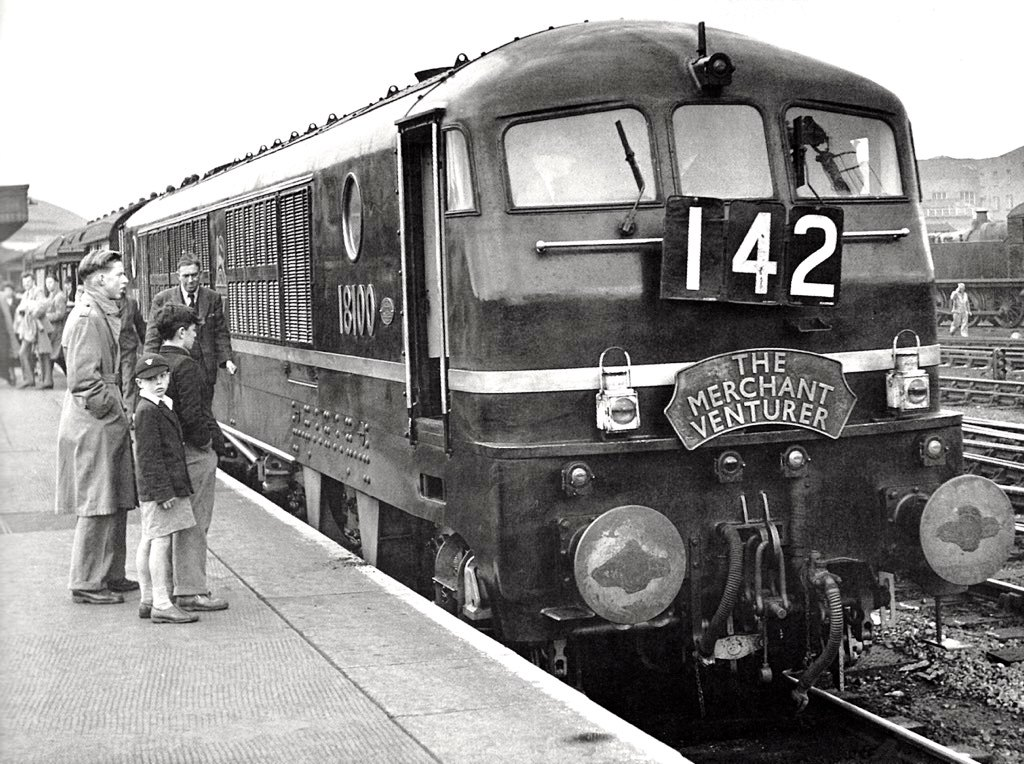
- 18100 in 1952
Type and origin
- Power type: Gas turbine–electric
- Builder: Metropolitan-Vickers, Trafford Park
- Order number: GWR Lot 388
- Build date: 1951
Specifications
- Configuration
  - Commonwealth: Co-Co
- Gauge: 4 ft 8 1/2 in (1,435 mm) standard gauge
- Wheel diameter: 3 ft 8 in (1.118 m)
- Wheelbase: 53 ft 0 in (16.15 m)
- Length: 66 ft 9 1/4 in (20.35 m)
- Width: 9 ft 0 in (2.74 m)
- Height: 12 ft 10 in (3.91 m)
- Loco weight: 129.50 long tons (131.58 t; 145.04 short tons)
- Prime mover: Gas turbine
- Generator: Metropolitan-Vickers, 3 off
- Traction motors: Metropolitan-Vickers, 6 off
- Transmission: DC generators DC traction motors
- Train heating: Spanner steam generator
- Train brakes: Vacuum
Performance figures
- Maximum speed: 90 mph (145 km/h)
- Power output: 3,000 hp (2,240 kW); At rail: 2,450 hp (1,830 kW)
- Tractive effort: 60,000 lbf (266.89 kN)
Career
- Operators: British Railways
- Power class: BR Type 5
- First run: 1952
- Last run: 1954
- Retired: December 1957
- Disposition: Rebuilt to 25 kV electric locomotive E1000 (E2001 from 1959)

British Rail 18100 was a prototype main line gas turbine–electric locomotive built for British Railways in 1951 by Metropolitan-Vickers, Manchester. It had, however, been ordered by the Great Western Railway in the 1940s, but construction was delayed due to World War II. It spent its working life on the Western Region of British Railways, operating express passenger services from Paddington station, London.

The locomotives basic parameters were stipulated by then chief mechanical engineer of the Great Western Railway. These requirements were that it should be suitable for hauling the heaviest passenger trains on the Western main routes, particularly that between London and Plymouth, and at speeds up to 90 m.p.h.

This needed a maximum starting tractive effort of the order of 60,000 lb and, with the stipulated maximum axle loading, that requires six driving axles. The same considerations led to fixing the continuous rating at 30,000 lb tractive effort. Electric transmission was adopted as the only practicable and reliable means of satisfying these conditions.

== Images ==
The main image is of 18100 at Bristol on 5 April 1952, having brought in the Merchant Venturer. There are images available of the locomotive in front of The Bristolian and in the works at Metro-Vickers in Manchester. Nearby are images of 18100 in retirement having been "stored" on a disused section of the GCR link between Ashendon (GWR) and Grendon junction (GCR). The site was near the A41 bridge and mile post 168. It seems that one of the coaches was used as weather station. Another image at the bottom of the page was also taken at Akeman street in 1969.

== Overview ==
It was of Co-Co wheel arrangement and its gas turbine was rated at 3,000 horsepower (2,200 kW). It had a maximum speed of 90 mph (140 km/h) and weighed 129.5 long tons (131.6 t; 145.0 short tons). It was painted in BR black livery, with a silver stripe around the middle of the body and silver numbers.

== Technical details ==
A simple open cycle gas turbine without heat exchanger is the prime mover and the cycle of compression, heating and expansion of the air is carried out in a compressor, combustion chamber and turbine arranged in line and built into a single straight through unit. The compressor is a 15-stage axial-flow machine with a pressure ratio of 5.25 at 7,000 r.p.m. The turbine is a five-stage unit with its rotor directly coupled to that of the compressor. The turbine drives three main traction generators at 1,600 r.p.m. through single reduction gearing. The reduction gear unit has two output shafts; one drives two of the main generators in tandem and the other drives the third main generator, the auxiliary generator and the exciter.

The gas turbine was of a type which would now be called a turboshaft engine but it differed from modern free-turbine turboshaft engines in having only one turbine to drive both the compressor and the output shaft. It was based on aircraft practice and had six horizontal combustion chambers (spaced radially around the turbine shaft) and no heat exchanger.

The emphasis was on power, rather than economy, and the fuel consumption was high. It was designed to use aviation kerosene and was much more expensive to run than No. 18000, which used heavy fuel oil.

Each main generator powered two traction motors. Unlike No. 18000, there was no auxiliary diesel engine and the turbine was started by battery power, using the main generators as starter motors.

== Comparison of 18000 and 18100 ==
The following table gives a comparison between 18000 and 18100. There are some anomalies and these are described in the notes.

Value	18000	18100	Notes
Weight (tons)	115	129	-
Turbine horsepower	10,300	9,000	(1)
Power absorbed by compressor	7,800	6,000	(1)
Output horsepower	2,500	3,000	(1)
Number of traction motors	4	6	-
Total traction motor horsepower	2,500	2,450	(2)
Starting tractive effort (lbf)	31,500	60,000	

Notes:

1. In 18000, output horsepower is 24% of total horsepower and in 18100, output horsepower is 33% of total horsepower. This suggests that 18100 had the higher thermal efficiency but, in practice, 18000 had the higher thermal efficiency. The horsepower figures should, therefore, be regarded with some scepticism.
2. Where electric transmission is used, the horsepower of the traction motors is usually 81% (i.e. 90% x 90%) that of the prime mover. The figure for 18100 is therefore about right but the figure for 18000 looks anomalous.

== Conversion ==
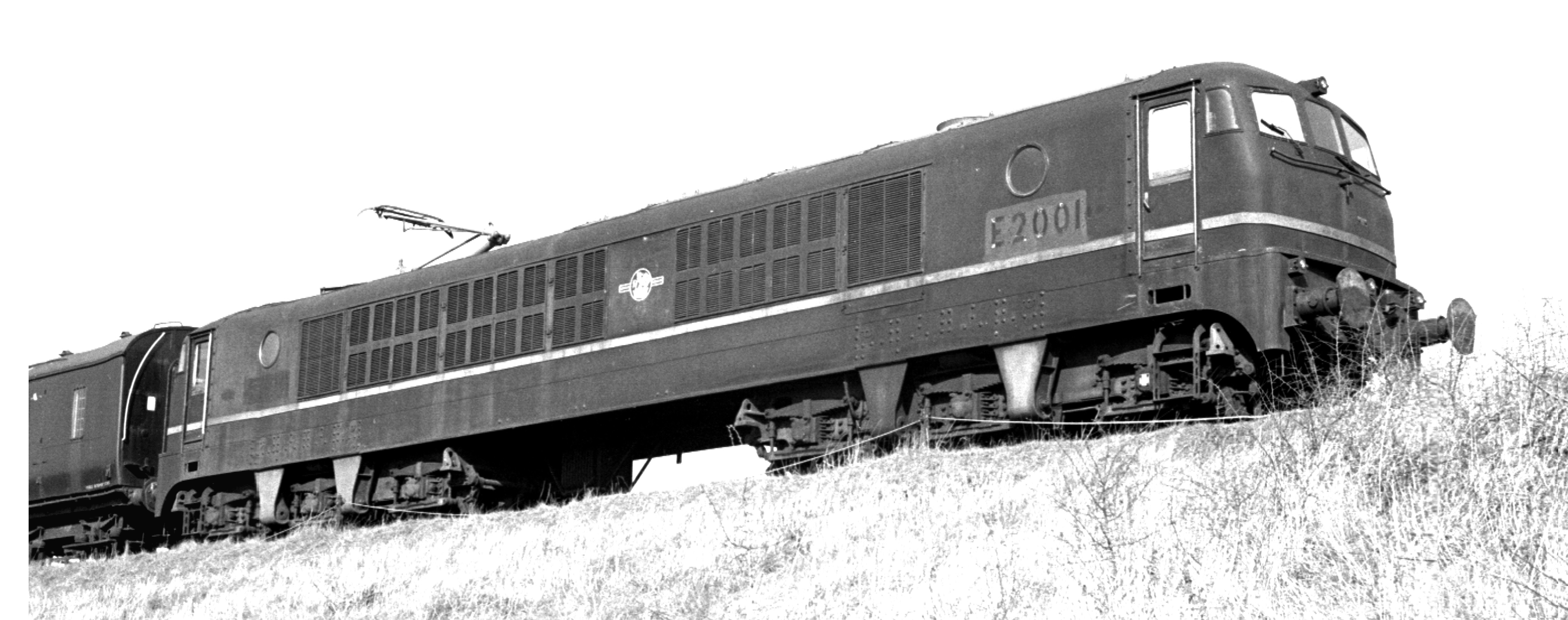
When this photo was taken in 1969 the Class 80 was stored on the disused Great Central near Akeman Street railway station.

In early 1958 it was withdrawn from operation and was stored at Swindon Works for a short period before it was returned to Metropolitan Vickers for conversion as a prototype 25 kV AC electric locomotive. As an electric locomotive, it was numbered E1000 (E2001 from 1959) and was given the TOPS classification of Class 80.

== See also ==
- British Rail 18000
- British Rail GT3
- British Rail APT-E

== Models ==
18100 is being made as a kit and ready-to-run in OO gauge by Silver Fox Models.
