= British Rail 18000 =

1949 prototype British gas turbine locomotive

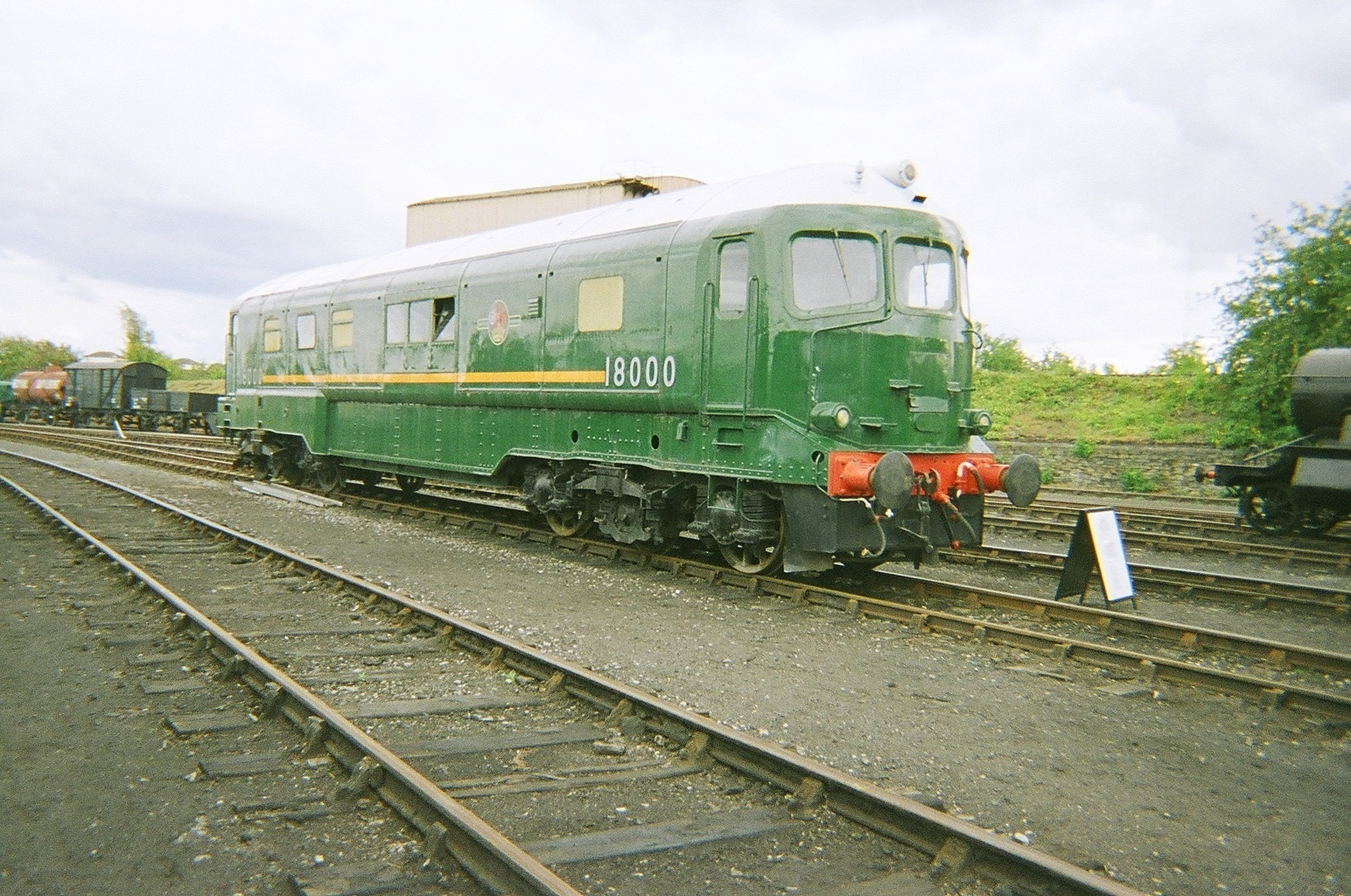
- British Rail 18000 at Didcot Railway Centre in 2011
Type and origin
- Power type: Gas turbine–electric
- Builder: Brown, Boveri & Cie and Swiss Locomotive and Machine Works
- Order number: GWR Lot 372
- Serial number: BBC: 4559; SLM: 3977
- Build date: 1949
- Total produced: 1
Specifications
- Configuration
  - UIC: (A1A)(A1A)
- Driver dia.: 4 ft 0 1/4 in (1,226 mm)
- Trailing dia.: 3 ft 2 in (965 mm)
- Loco weight: 115.18 long tons (117.03 t; 129.00 short tons)
- Engine type: Gas turbine
- Generator: DC
- Traction motors: Four DC
- Transmission: Electric
- Train heating: Steam generator
Performance figures
- Maximum speed: 90 mph (145 km/h)
- Power output: 2,500 hp (1,900 kW)
- Tractive effort: 31,500 lbf (140,000 N)
Career
- Operators: British Railways
- Power class: BR: 4
- Nicknames: Kerosene Castle
- Disposition: Preserved

British Rail 18000 is a prototype mainline gas turbine–electric locomotive built for British Railways in 1949 by Brown, Boveri & Cie. An earlier gas-turbine locomotive, 18100, had been ordered from Metropolitan-Vickers by the Great Western Railway but construction was delayed due to World War II; a second, 18000, was thus ordered from Switzerland in 1946. It spent its working life on the Western Region of British Railways, operating express passenger services from Paddington station, London.

== Overview ==
The GWR chose a gas-turbine locomotive because, at the time, there was no single-unit diesel locomotive of sufficient power available. The King class steam locomotive could deliver about 2,500 horsepower (1,900 kW) at the rail. The LMS diesel locomotives had engines of only 1,600 hp (1,200 kW). After allowing for transmission losses, this would be down to about 1,300 hp (970 kW) at the rail, so two diesels would be needed to match a King.

No. 18000 was of A1A-A1A wheel arrangement and its gas turbine was rated at 2,500 hp (1,900 kW). It had a maximum speed of 90 miles per hour (145 km/h) and weighed 115 long tons (117 t; 129 short tons). It was painted in BR black livery, with a silver stripe around the middle of the body and silver numbers.

== Technical details ==
=== Gas turbine ===
The gas turbine was a Brown Boveri industrial machine. It was of a type which would now be called a turboshaft engine but differed from modern free-turbine turboshaft engines in having only one turbine to drive both the compressor and the output shaft. The emphasis was on fuel economy so it had a heat exchanger (to recover waste heat from the exhaust) and was designed to run on cheap heavy fuel oil (it was also able to burn light oil but this was intended only for startup purposes). This was the same fuel that was used in oil-fired steam locomotives. After leaving the heat exchanger, the pre-heated air entered a large, vertical, combustion chamber where the fuel was injected and burned.

=== Auxiliary diesel engine ===
There was also an auxiliary diesel engine which provided power for starting the gas turbine. The diesel engine was capable of moving the locomotive at a slow speed when the gas turbine was not running. The usual procedure was to run the locomotive from the shed to Paddington station using the diesel engine and to start the gas turbine only a few minutes before the train was due to leave. This saved fuel and minimised annoyance from noise and exhaust fumes.

=== Problems ===
It proved a troublesome machine in service. Ash from the heavy fuel oil damaged the turbine blades, and the combustion chamber liner required frequent replacement due to damage. The electrical control systems were extremely complex for the time and gave much trouble; maintenance of the electrical equipment in a steam locomotive environment and knowledge base was difficult. Part way through its life one of the traction motors failed and instead of repairing or replacing it, it was simply removed, leaving the locomotive with only three traction motors and preventing it from achieving its full power output. It also suffered from the destruction of its heat exchanger in a fire at Temple Meads when combustion deposits in the exhaust side of the heat exchanger ignited.

=== Fuel costs ===
It was also much more expensive to run than expected. The efficiency of a gas turbine reduces dramatically at low power outputs so, to achieve respectable fuel economy, a gas turbine locomotive needs to be operated as much as possible at full power, with periods of part-load running reduced to a minimum. However, it turned out that, even on demanding express passenger schedules, it was not possible to operate the locomotive on full power for very much of the run and extended periods of part-load operation were inevitable, which resulted in heavy fuel consumption. It was also sometimes operated on the much more expensive and scarce light oil normally used only for starting, due to the level of wear caused by the ash from heavy fuel oil.

== Performance ==
When reliable operation could be achieved, it did show itself capable of meeting expectations. Unfortunately, however, it was neither possible to achieve a consistently acceptable level of reliability nor to operate it under conditions which would allow reasonable fuel economy.

== Comparison of 18000 and 18100 ==
The following table gives a comparison between 18000 and 18100. There are some anomalies and these are described in the notes.

Value	18000	18100	Notes
Weight (Long tons)	115 long tons (117 t; 129 short tons)	129 long tons (131 t; 144 short tons)	-
Turbine horsepower (kW)	10,300 hp (7,700 kW)	9,000 hp (6,700 kW)	(Note: In 18000, output horsepower is 24% of total horsepower and in 18100, output horsepower is 33% of total horsepower. This suggests that 18100 had the higher thermal efficiency but, in practice, 18000 had the higher thermal efficiency. The horsepower figures should, therefore, be regarded with some scepticism.)
Power absorbed by compressor (kW)	7,800 hp (5,800 kW)	6,000 hp (4,500 kW)	
Output horsepower (kW)	2,500 hp (1,900 kW)	3,000 hp (2,200 kW)	
Number of traction motors	4	6	-
Total traction motor horsepower (kW)	2,500 hp (1,900 kW)	2,450 hp (1,830 kW)	(Note: Where electric transmission is used, the horsepower of the traction motors is usually 81% (i.e. 90% x 90%) that of the prime mover. The figure for 18100 is therefore about right but the figure for 18000 looks anomalous.)
Starting tractive effort (lbf)	31,500 lbf (140,000 N)	60,000 lbf (270,000 N)	(Note: lbf = pound-force)

== Post-BR use ==
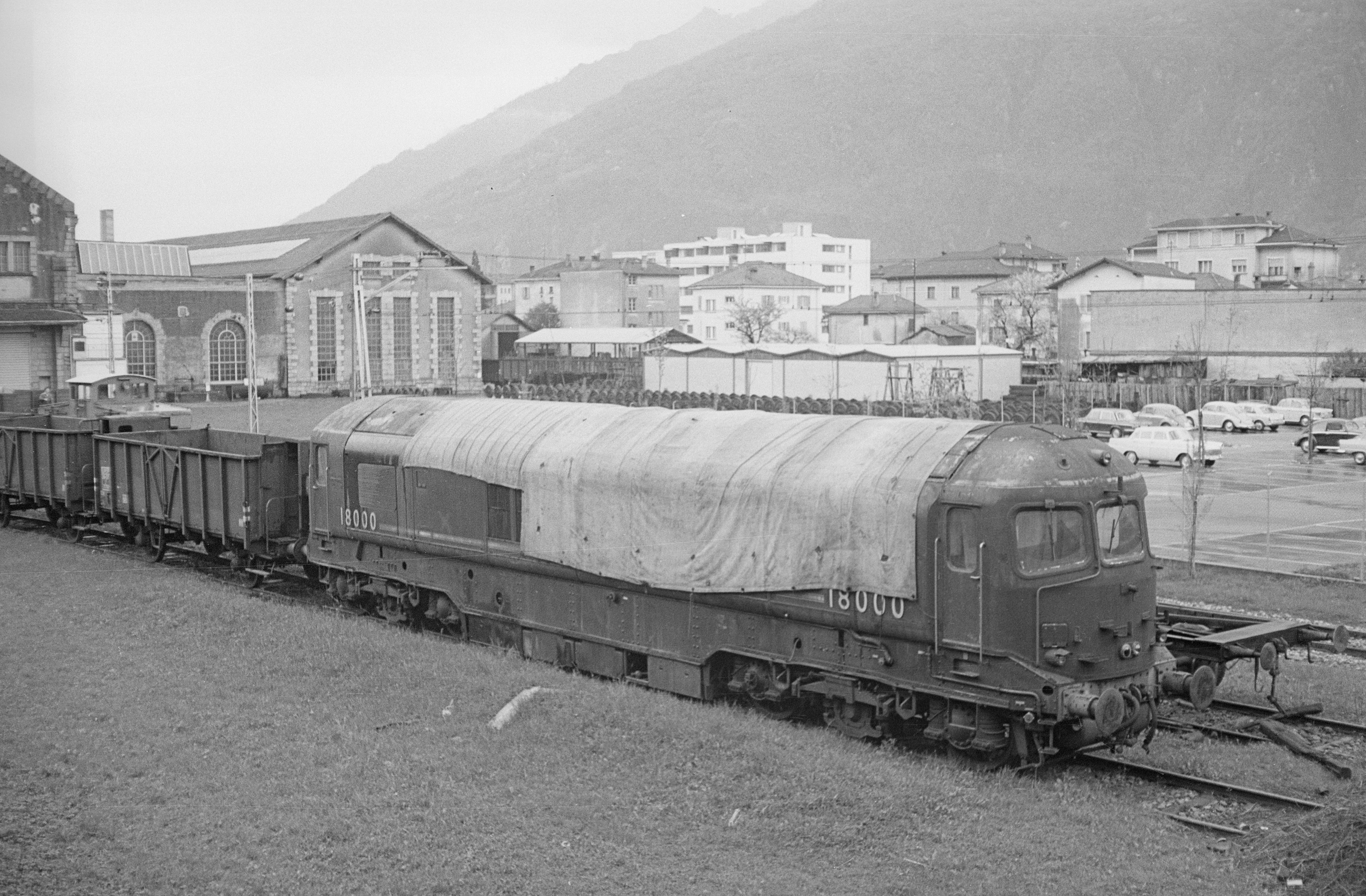
18000 at Bellinzona, Switzerland (1967)

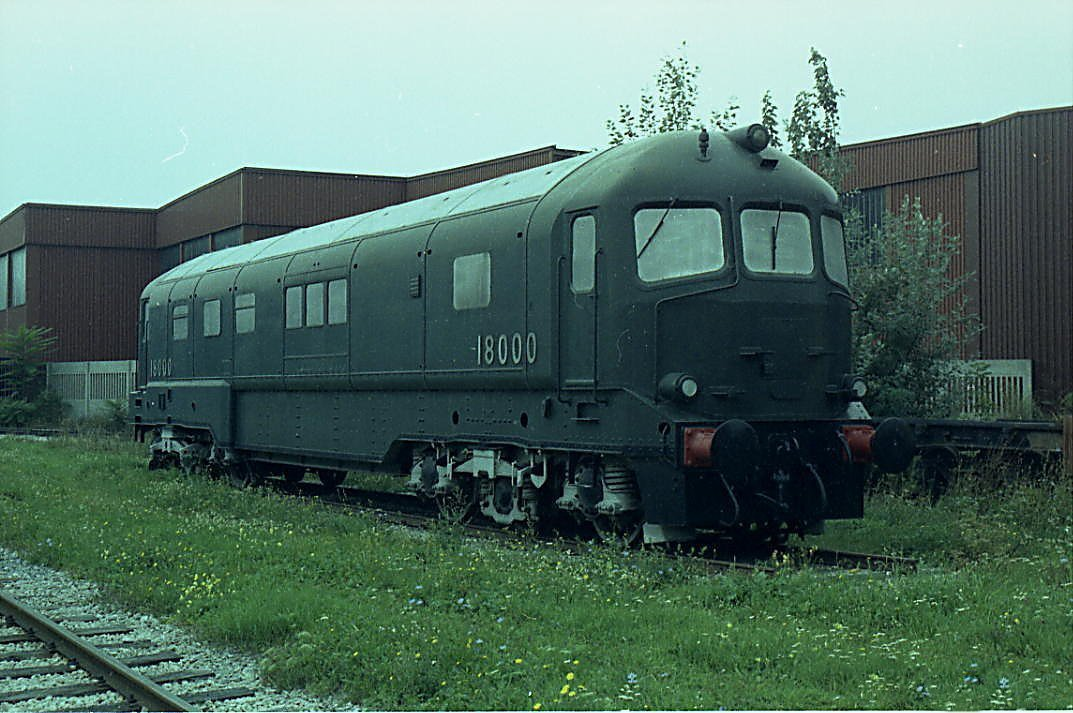
18000 at Vienna in 1989

At the end of 1960, 18000 was withdrawn from operation and was stored at Swindon Works for four years. It then returned to mainland Europe, where for more than ten years it was used, in substantially altered (and no longer gas-turbine-powered) form, for experiments concerning the interaction between steel wheels and steel rails, under the auspices of the International Union of Railways. In 1975 it was moved to Vienna and displayed outside the Mechanical Engineering Testing building of the Arsenal research centre.

== Preservation ==
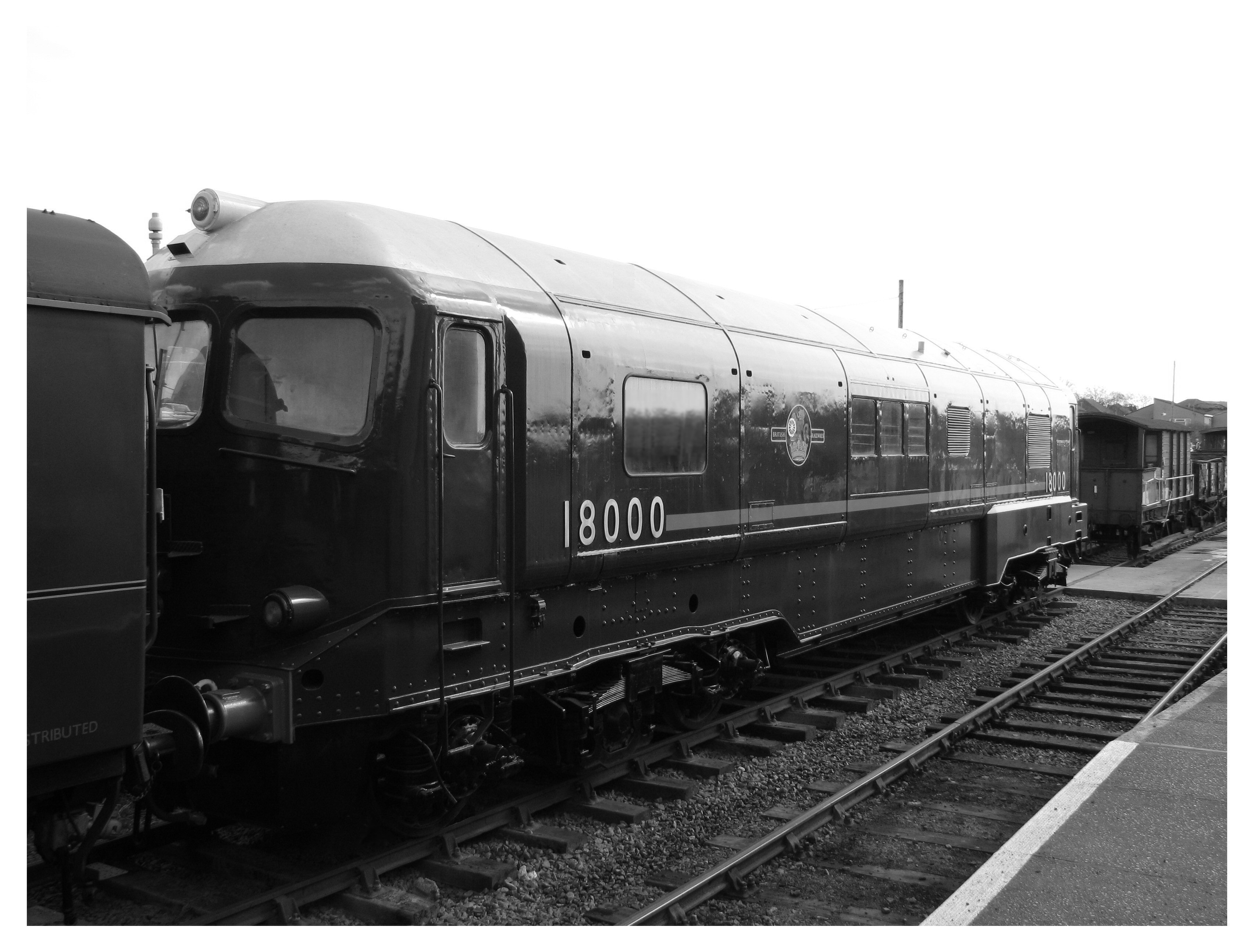
British Rail 18000 at Barrow Hill in 2009

In the early 1990s it was secured for preservation. It returned to the UK and was kept at The Railway Age, Crewe. It was then moved to Barrow Hill Roundhouse and was repainted in green livery.

Exhibited at Gloucestershire Warwickshire Railway

In mid-April 2010 it was delivered to the Gloucestershire Warwickshire Railway in order to take part (as a static exhibit) in the celebrations for the 175th birthday of the Great Western Railway from 29 May to 6 June 2010.

Moved to Didcot Railway Centre

Since then, it has moved to Didcot. It arrived at the yard, west of Didcot Parkway railway station, on 20 July 2011 and was moved into Didcot Railway Centre on 29 July 2011. It is now owned by the Pete Waterman Trust.

== Models ==
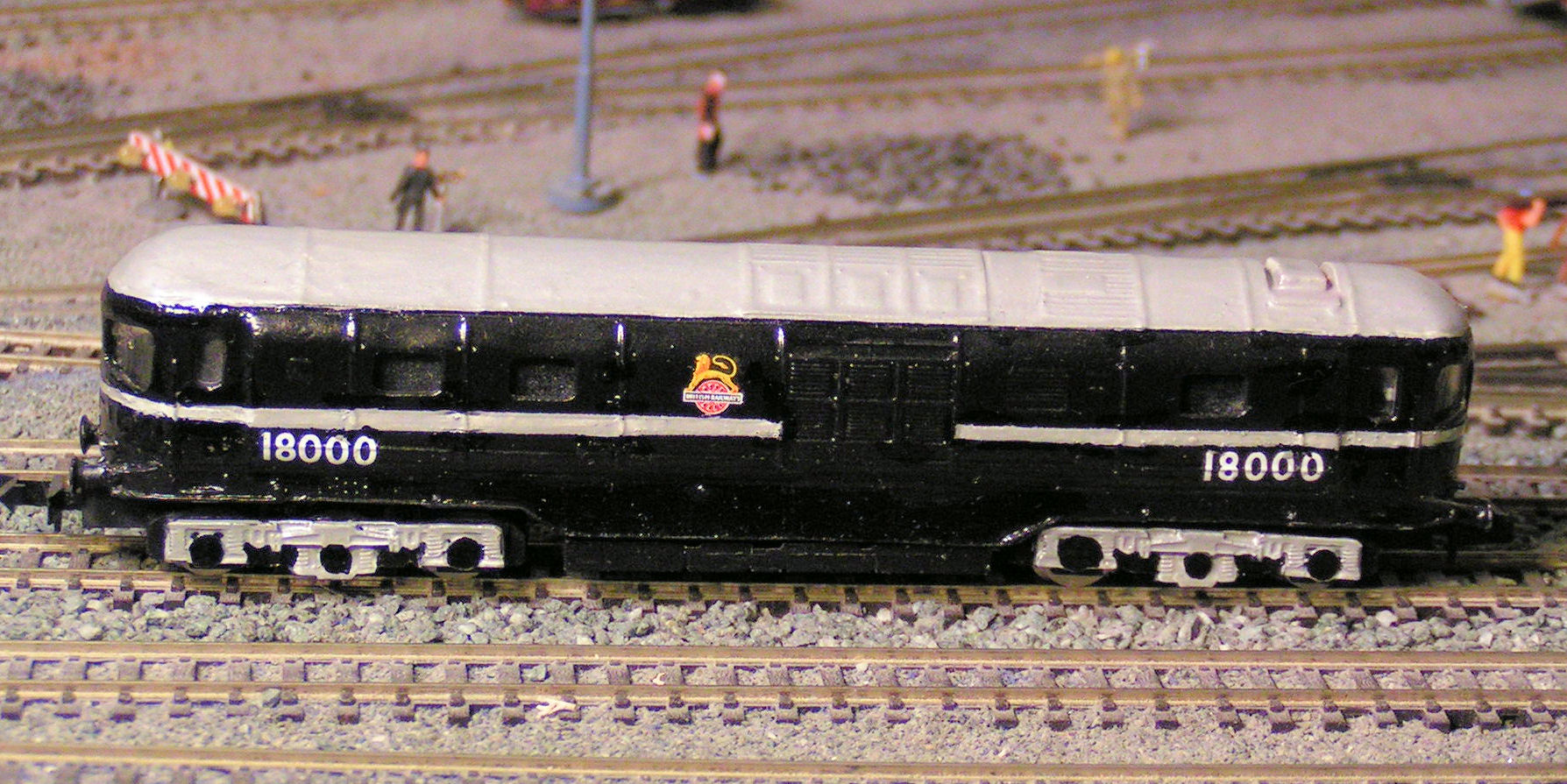
British Rail 18000 in N scale

18000 is made as a kit and ready-to-run in OO gauge by Silver Fox Models. A further ready-to run version is planned in 2020 by Rails of Sheffield.

== See also ==
- British Rail 18100
- British Rail GT3
- British Rail APT-E
- Union Pacific GTELs
