= Alstom Crespin =

French rolling stock manufacturer

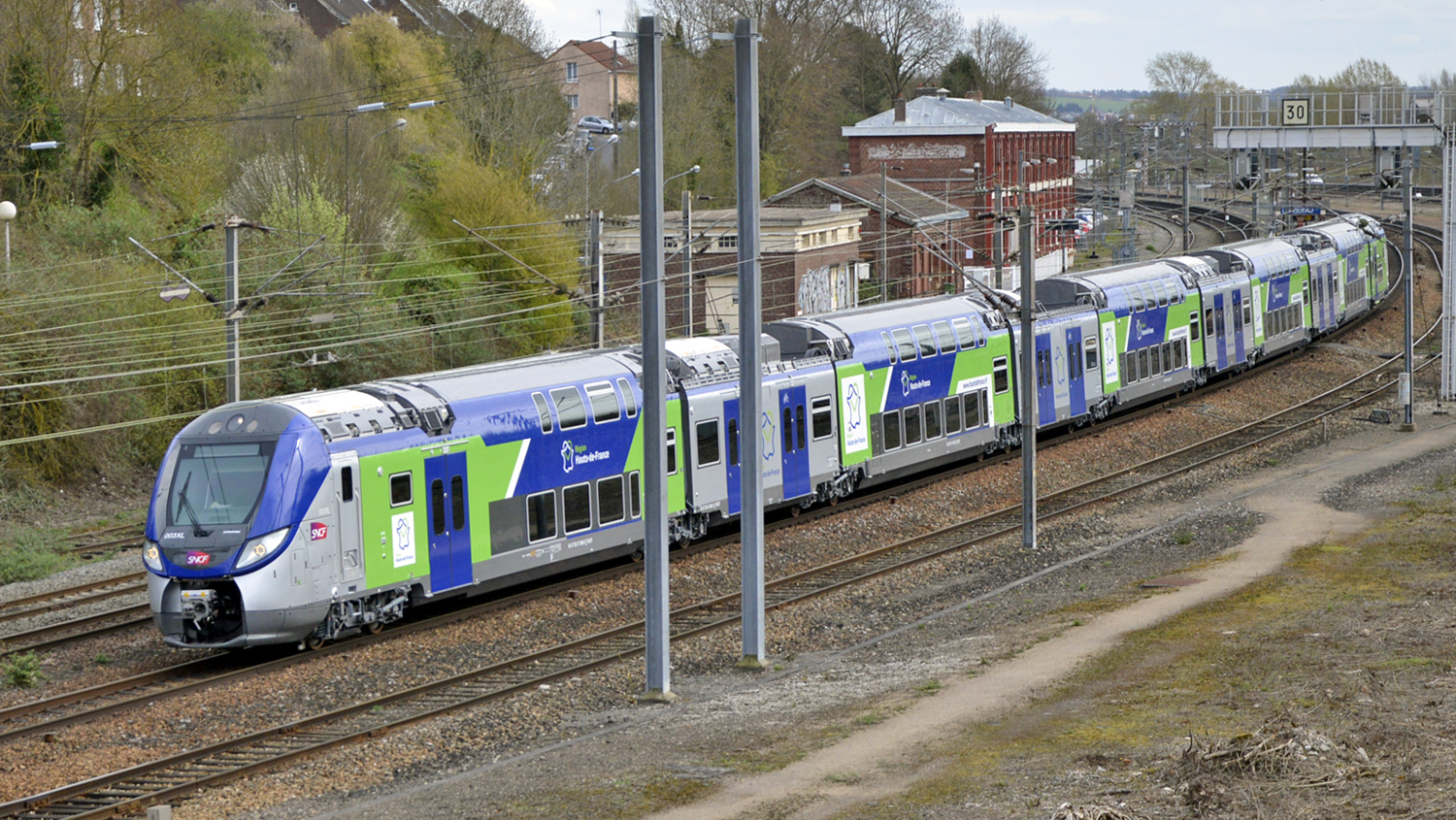
- Company type: Société par actions simplifiée
- Industry: Rail Transport
- Founded: 1882; 144 years ago
- Headquarters: Crespin, France
- Key people: Laurent Bouyer (President)
- Products: Intercity and commuter trains People movers
- Number of employees: 1,500 (2019)
- Parent: Alstom
- Website: www.alstom.com

Alstom Crespin, formerly Bombardier Transport France and ANF Industrie, is a French rolling stock manufacturer based at Crespin, in Hauts-de-France region, France. The company was acquired by Bombardier Transportation in 1989, then by Alstom in 2021.

== History ==
=== Origins ===
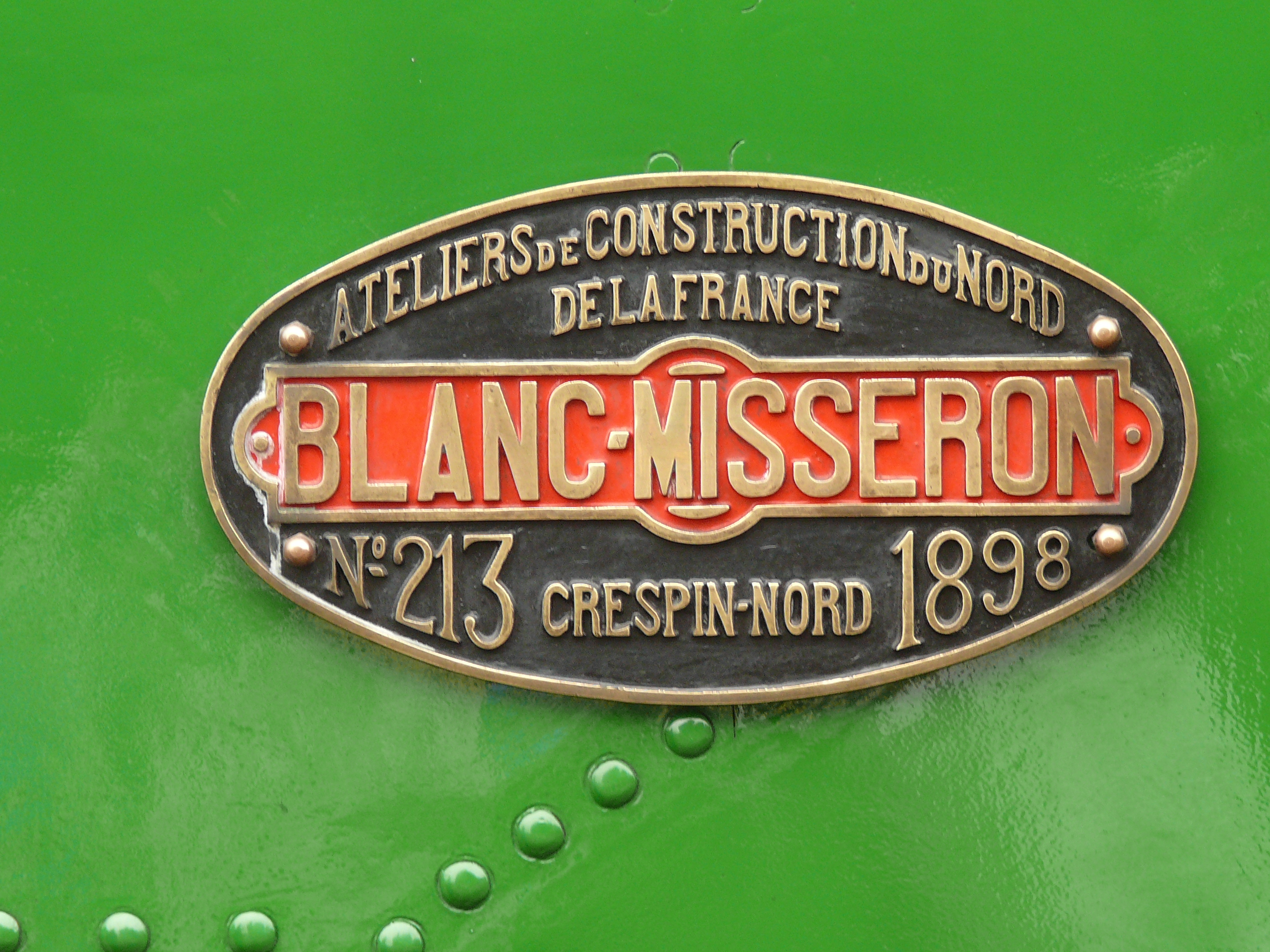
ANF builders plate on preserved tram locomotives N°60 of the Tramways de la Sarthe

Les Ateliers de Construction du Nord de la France (The Construction Workshops in the North of France) was founded in 1882 as a subsidiary of Franco-Belgian company La Métallurgique. (Note: La Métallurgique was founded in 1880, it was succeeded by Trust Métallurgique Belge-Français in 1899/1900.) The company was established to avoid import tariffs imposed in 1881 in France on goods imported from Belgium.

In 1908 the company merged with and absorbed Société Nicaise et Delcuve (based in La Louvière, Belgium), and was renamed Ateliers du Nord de la France et Nicaise et Delcuve by 1910.

In 1913 the Trust Métallurgique Belge-Français reorganised; the factories in La Louvière, Belgium (the former Nicaise et Delcuve) were combined with other of the Trust Métallurgique Belge-Français interests in Belgian industry (including La Société la Brugeoise) to form La Société La Brugeoise et Nicaise et Delcuve, and the Ateliers du Nord de la France became an entirely French concern.

During World War I the factory was occupied by the Germans, and its material removed to Germany. Post war the factory was rebuilt and its machinery recovered. By 1928 production had reached pre-war levels and employed around 4,000 people. The Great Depression caused a reduction in the workforce to half previous, and a similar decrease in production.

In 1934 the company acquired part of the shares of Sambre et Meuse, which became an important manufacturer of cast steel parts for rolling stock (i.e. bogies).

During World War II the main ANF plant at Blanc-Misseron initially produced orders for military use, and was later occupied by the German forces. The plant was a target of Allied bombing in 1944 due to its use in keeping the rail network in occupied territory running.

In 1970 ANF Industrie produced the Turbotrain, a high-speed gas turbine train. It saw limited success due to the oil crisis of the late 1970s, and was overshadowed by the TGV.

Between 1986 and 1988, the 425 R68 New York City Subway Cars were manufactured by Westinghouse Amrail Company, a joint venture of Westinghouse and Francorail (itself a joint venture of ANF Industrie, Jeumont Schneider, and Alsthom), with ANF Industrie as leader.

=== Acquisition by Bombardier ===
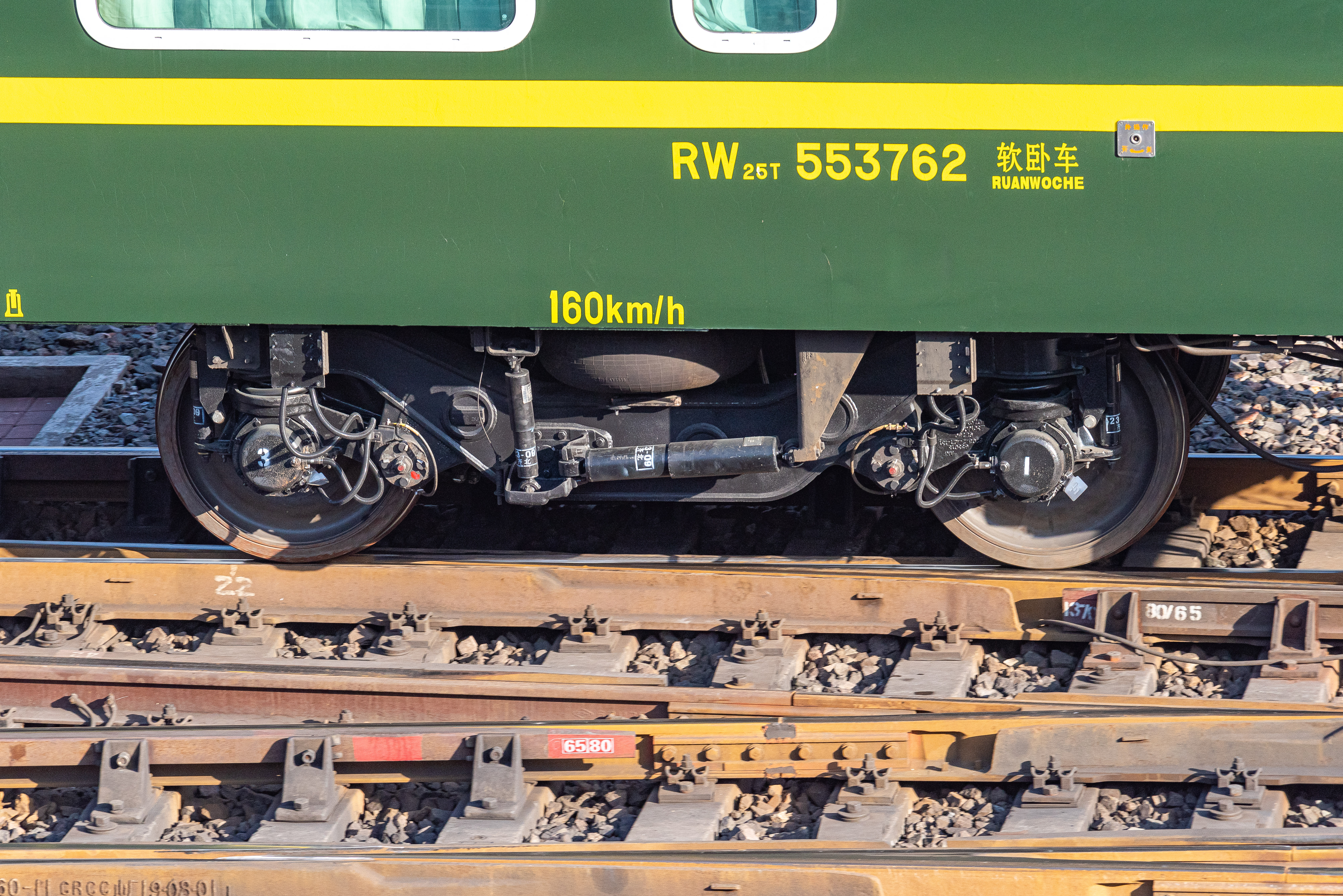
The AM96 bogie built by ANF Industrie, used for China Railway 25T coaches by Bombardier-Sifang-Power

In 1987 the Francorail industrial association ended, due to the transfer of Schneider group's railway activities to Alsthom; the resultant isolation of ANF within the railway sector led to its acquisition by Bombardier in 1989.

In November 2001 after the acquisition of Adtranz, Bombardier indicated that the plant would be one of three main sites in Europe for bogie manufacture, and a core site for final assembly. Bombardier has made the plant one of its key production sites with over 2,000 employees (2010), and claims an investment of over €500 million. The site accounts for around one third of French domestic passenger rail production.

Following its takeover by Bombardier, the manufacturer has also signed contracts that provide for production at the Crespin site, including: a participation with Alstom in the construction of the MF 01, the so-called Autorail à grande capacité (AGC) trainsets, the Francilien NAT and Regio 2N trainsets.

On 4 December 2020, Bombardier Transportation announces a €25 million investment plan to modernise and increase the production capacity of its Crespin plant, in the presence of Xavier Bertrand, President of the Hauts-de-France region.

== See also ==
- La Brugeoise et Nivelles, Belgian rolling stock manufacturer, now part of Bombardier Transportation
- Société Franco-Belge, rolling stock manufacture, now part of Alstom with factory located at Raismes, Valenciennes, France
