= Class 80 =

Class 80 or 80 class may refer to:

- British Rail Class 80
- DRG Class 80, a class of 39 German 0-6-0T steam locomotive
- NIR Class 80, a diesel-electric multiple unit of the Northern Ireland Railways
- New South Wales 80 class locomotive, an Australian diesel locomotive

== See also ==
- Type 80 (disambiguation)
