= South African Class 5E1, Series 1 =

Type of electric locomotive

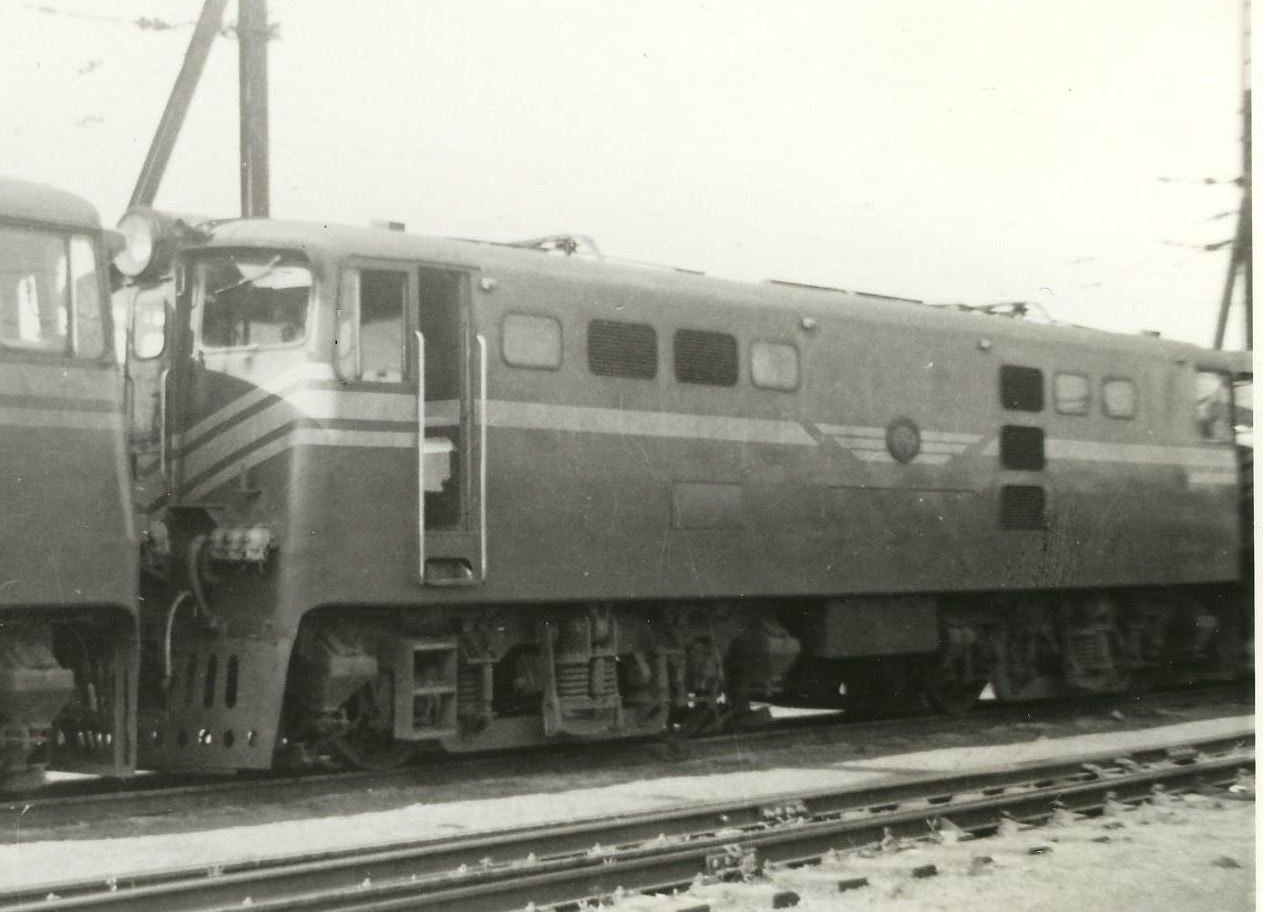
- No. E464 at Salt River, Cape Town, 7 January 1966
Type and origin
- Power type: Electric
- Designer: Metropolitan-Vickers
- Builder: Metropolitan-Vickers
- Serial number: 1032-1166
- Model: MV 5E1
- Build date: 1959-1961
- Total produced: 135
Specifications
- Configuration
  - AAR: B-B
  - UIC: Bo′Bo′
  - Commonwealth: Bo-Bo
- Gauge: 3 ft 6 in (1,067 mm) Cape gauge
- Wheel diameter: 1,220 mm (48.03 in)
- Wheelbase: 11,279 mm (37 ft 1/16 in)
  - Bogie: 3,430 mm (11 ft 3 1/16 in)
- Pivot centres: 7,849 mm (25 ft 9 in)
- Panto shoes: 6,972 mm (22 ft 10 1/2 in)
- Length
  - Over couplers: 15,494 mm (50 ft 10 in)
  - Over beams: 14,631 mm (48 ft 0 in)
- Width: 2,896 mm (9 ft 6 in)
- Height
  - Pantograph: 4,089 mm (13 ft 5 in)
  - Body height: 3,937 mm (12 ft 11 in)
- Axle load: 21,591 kg (47,600 lb)
- Adhesive weight: 86,364 kg (190,400 lb)
- Loco weight: 86,364 kg (190,400 lb)
- Electric system/s: 3 kV DC catenary
- Current pickup(s): Pantographs
- Traction motors: Four MV 281
  - Rating 1 hour: 485 kW (650 hp)
  - Continuous: 364 kW (488 hp)
- Gear ratio: 18:67
- Loco brake: Air & regenerative
- Train brakes: Vacuum
- Couplers: AAR knuckle
Performance figures
- Maximum speed: 97 km/h (60 mph)
- Power output
  - 1 hour: 1,940 kW (2,600 hp)
  - Continuous: 1,456 kW (1,953 hp)
- Tractive effort
  - Starting: 250 kN (56,000 lbf)
  - 1 hour: 184 kN (41,000 lbf)
  - Continuous: 122 kN (27,000 lbf) @ 40 km/h (25 mph)
Career
- Operators: South African Railways; Spoornet
- Class: Class 5E1
- Number in class: 135
- Numbers: E364-E498
- Delivered: 1959-1961
- First run: 1959

The South African Railways Class 5E1, Series 1 of 1959 was an electric locomotive.

Between 1959 and 1961, the South African Railways placed 135 Class 5E1, Series 1 electric locomotives with a Bo-Bo wheel arrangement in mainline service. It was an upgraded and more powerful version of the Class 5E.

== Manufacturer ==
The first series of the 3 kV DC Class 5E1 electric locomotive was designed and built for the South African Railways (SAR) by Metropolitan-Vickers (Metrovick) at its Bowesfield Works. Metrovick was one of the companies owned by the Associated Electrical Industries holding group (AEI) who supplied the electrical equipment. In all, 135 locomotives were delivered between 1959 and 1961, numbered in the range from E364 to E498. These were the last electric locomotives to be imported from the United Kingdom.

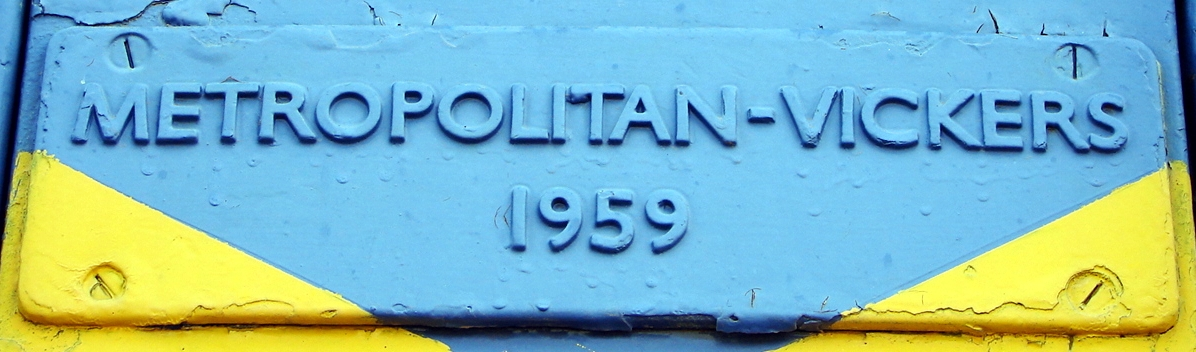
Builder's plate on no. E397

The Class 5E1 was virtually identical in outward appearance to the forerunner Class 5E, but with more powerful traction motors and with a new Commonwealth bogie design that gave a smoother ride. Apart from the bogies, an externally visible difference from the Class 5E is the size and location of the small access panels on the lower body sides.

== Class 5E1 series ==
The Class 5E1 was produced in five series, the Metrovick built Series 1 and the Union Carriage & Wagon (UCW) built Series 2 to 5. Between 1959 and 1969 altogether 690 of them were built, 135 Series 1, 130 Series 2, 100 Series 3, 100 Series 4 and 225 Series 5.

With the exception of the Series 2 and 3, the series distinction between Class 5E1 locomotives was mainly based on the different model traction motors each was equipped with, MV 281 in Series 1, AEI 281 AZX in Series 2 and 3, AEI 281 AX in Series 4 and AEI 281 BX in Series 5. The distinction between the series 2 and 3 locomotives appears to have been based on the difference in the design of their traction motor bearings.

== Identifying features ==
These dual cab locomotives had a roof access ladder on one side only, just to the right of the cab access door. The roof access ladder end was marked as the no. 2 end. A corridor along the centre of the locomotive connected the cabs, which were identical except that cab 2 was where the handbrake was located.

The locomotive had two cut-outs on the roofline on the roof access ladder side, but an unbroken roofline on the opposite side. Like the predecessor Class 5E, the Class 5E1, Series 1 had two rectangular access panels on the lower sides above the battery box, but it also had an additional rectangular panel on the lower sides above the second axle from the left.

The Series 1 and 2 locomotives could be distinguished from each other by the builder's plates on their end doors, a rectangular Metropolitan-Vickers plate on Series 1 locomotives and an oval Union Carriage and Wagon plate on Series 2. The Series 3, 4 and 5 locomotives could be visually distinguished from earlier models by their three small square access panels on the lower sides above the battery box, compared to the two larger rectangular panels on the Series 1 and 2 locomotives. Series 4 and 5 locomotives could be distinguished from all earlier models by their one small square and one larger rectangular access panels on the lower sides above the second axle from the left, compared to the single rectangular panel on all earlier models.

== Brakes ==
The locomotive itself used air brakes, but it was only equipped to operate trains with vacuum brakes. While hauling a train, the locomotive's air brake system would be made subordinate to the train's brake system and would come into operation as the train brakes were being applied, gradually building up to its maximum pressure of 350 kilopascals (51 pounds per square inch). While working a train downgrade, the locomotive's regenerative braking system would also work in conjunction with the train brakes.

The locomotive's air brakes would usually only be used along with the train brakes during emergencies. Under normal circumstances the train would be controlled using the train brakes alone to slow down and stop.

While the locomotive was stopped, the air brakes on each bogie could be applied independently. The handbrake or parking brake, located in cab 2, only operated on the unit's last axle, the no. 7 and 8 wheels.

== Traction motor bearings ==
The axle-hung traction motors of all earlier SAR electric locomotives up to and including the Class 5E1, Series 1, were suspended on the axles by means of plain oil-lubricated bearings consisting of bronze shells with white metal linings. With the introduction of the more powerful Class 5E1, Series 1, considerable trouble was experienced due to flaking of the white metal linings as a result of the increased intensity of the pressure on these bearings. The use of roller bearings was investigated and one traction motor of a Class 1E locomotive was converted for trial purposes. Since satisfactory results were obtained, it was decided to equip the traction motors of the subsequent UCW built Series 2 and later locomotives with roller-type suspension bearings.

== Liveries ==
Prior to 1960, green was the traditional colour for electric locomotives, with yellow whiskers and side-stripes being added in the late 1950s. When the SAR celebrated 100 years of railways in South Africa in 1960, new colour schemes were adopted for passenger stock as well as electric and diesel-electric locomotives. Gulf Red with signal red cowcatchers was the colour initially chosen for locomotives and the yellow whiskers and stripes were carried over from the earlier green livery. The yellow side-stripes were initially applied to the full body-length of electric locomotives, but these were later curtailed to just beyond the cab-sides, with the number plates on the sides enclosed in three-stripe wings.

The early deliveries of Series 1 units still entered service in the bottle green and yellow whiskers livery with red cowcatchers. The later arrivals of Series 1 locomotives were delivered in this newly adopted livery. The change from the green to the red livery appears to have occurred somewhere between no. E446 in green and no. E451 in Gulf Red. The units were delivered in plain green or red and the yellow whiskers were added in South Africa during their erection.

Some selected electric and diesel-electric locomotives were painted blue for use with the Blue Train, but without altering the layout of the various paint schemes. Blue Train locomotives were therefore blue with yellow whiskers in the SAR era. During the 1970s eight Class 5E1, Series 1 locomotives, numbers E441 to E448, were painted blue with yellow whiskers for use with the Blue Train between Cape Town and Beaufort West in the Cape Western region. By 1981 they were all back in pool service and were gradually repainted to Gulf Red and whiskers again as they were shopped for major overhauls.

== Service ==
The Class 5E1 family served on all 3 kV DC electrified mainlines country-wide for almost forty years. The Class 5E1 worked the vacuum-braked goods and mainline passenger trains over the lines radiating south, west and north of Durban almost exclusively until the mid-1970s and Class 6E1s only became regular motive power in Natal when air-braked car trains began running between Durban and the Reef.

By the early 2000s the Series 1 locomotives had all been withdrawn from SAR service. Unit no. E496 was still in service by 2014 as shop shunting locomotive at MetroRail's depot at Salt River, Cape Town, painted in a grey and yellow livery to match that of Metrorail’s carriages, with yellow cowcatchers and with reflective stripe whiskers on the ends. Apart from this unit, the shells of numbers E397 and E461 have been converted to a club room at Sentrarand. No more of the Metrovick built Class 5E1, Series 1 are known to have survived. While these two shells are now painted in the SAR Blue Train livery, neither unit wore the blue livery while still in service.

== Works numbers ==
The Metrovick works numbers of the Class 5E1, Series 1 and their years of construction are listed in the table.

Class 5E1, Series 1
| Loco no. | MV works no. | Year built |
|---|---|---|
| E364 | 1032 | 1959 |
| E365 | 1033 | 1959 |
| E366 | 1034 | 1959 |
| E367 | 1035 | 1959 |
| E368 | 1036 | 1959 |
| E369 | 1037 | 1959 |
| E370 | 1038 | 1959 |
| E371 | 1039 | 1959 |
| E372 | 1040 | 1959 |
| E373 | 1041 | 1959 |
| E374 | 1042 | 1959 |
| E375 | 1043 | 1959 |
| E376 | 1044 | 1959 |
| E377 | 1045 | 1959 |
| E378 | 1046 | 1959 |
| E379 | 1047 | 1959 |
| E380 | 1048 | 1959 |
| E381 | 1049 | 1959 |
| E382 | 1050 | 1959 |
| E383 | 1051 | 1959 |
| E384 | 1052 | 1959 |
| E385 | 1053 | 1959 |
| E386 | 1054 | 1959 |
| E387 | 1055 | 1959 |
| E388 | 1056 | 1959 |
| E389 | 1057 | 1959 |
| E390 | 1058 | 1959 |
| E391 | 1059 | 1959 |
| E392 | 1060 | 1959 |
| E393 | 1061 | 1959 |
| E394 | 1062 | 1959 |
| E395 | 1063 | 1959 |
| E396 | 1064 | 1959 |
| E397 | 1065 | 1959 |
| E398 | 1066 | 1959–61 |
| E399 | 1067 | 1959–61 |
| E400 | 1068 | 1959–61 |
| E401 | 1069 | 1959–61 |
| E402 | 1070 | 1959–61 |
| E403 | 1071 | 1959–61 |
| E404 | 1072 | 1959–61 |
| E405 | 1073 | 1959–61 |
| E406 | 1074 | 1959–61 |
| E407 | 1075 | 1959–61 |
| E408 | 1076 | 1959–61 |
| E409 | 1077 | 1959–61 |
| E410 | 1078 | 1959–61 |
| E411 | 1079 | 1959–61 |
| E412 | 1080 | 1959–61 |
| E413 | 1081 | 1959–61 |
| E414 | 1082 | 1959–61 |
| E415 | 1083 | 1959–61 |
| E416 | 1084 | 1959–61 |
| E417 | 1085 | 1959–61 |
| E418 | 1086 | 1959–61 |
| E419 | 1087 | 1959–61 |
| E420 | 1088 | 1959–61 |
| E421 | 1089 | 1959–61 |
| E422 | 1090 | 1959–61 |
| E423 | 1091 | 1959–61 |
| E424 | 1092 | 1959–61 |
| E425 | 1093 | 1959–61 |
| E426 | 1094 | 1959–61 |
| E427 | 1095 | 1959–61 |
| E428 | 1096 | 1959–61 |
| E429 | 1097 | 1959–61 |
| E430 | 1098 | 1959–61 |
| E431 | 1099 | 1959–61 |
| E432 | 1100 | 1959–61 |
| E433 | 1101 | 1959–61 |
| E434 | 1102 | 1959–61 |
| E435 | 1103 | 1959–61 |
| E436 | 1104 | 1959–61 |
| E437 | 1105 | 1959–61 |
| E438 | 1106 | 1959–61 |
| E439 | 1107 | 1959–61 |
| E440 | 1108 | 1959–61 |
| E441 | 1109 | 1959–61 |
| E442 | 1110 | 1959–61 |
| E443 | 1111 | 1959–61 |
| E444 | 1112 | 1959–61 |
| E445 | 1113 | 1959–61 |
| E446 | 1114 | 1959–61 |
| E447 | 1115 | 1959–61 |
| E448 | 1116 | 1959–61 |
| E449 | 1117 | 1959–61 |
| E450 | 1118 | 1959–61 |
| E451 | 1119 | 1959–61 |
| E452 | 1120 | 1959–61 |
| E453 | 1121 | 1959–61 |
| E454 | 1122 | 1959–61 |
| E455 | 1123 | 1959–61 |
| E456 | 1124 | 1959–61 |
| E457 | 1125 | 1959–61 |
| E458 | 1126 | 1959–61 |
| E459 | 1127 | 1959–61 |
| E460 | 1128 | 1959–61 |
| E461 | 1129 | 1959–61 |
| E462 | 1130 | 1959–61 |
| E463 | 1131 | 1959–61 |
| E464 | 1132 | 1959–61 |
| E465 | 1133 | 1959–61 |
| E466 | 1134 | 1959–61 |
| E467 | 1135 | 1959–61 |
| E468 | 1136 | 1959–61 |
| E469 | 1137 | 1959–61 |
| E470 | 1138 | 1959–61 |
| E471 | 1139 | 1959–61 |
| E472 | 1140 | 1959–61 |
| E473 | 1141 | 1959–61 |
| E474 | 1142 | 1959–61 |
| E475 | 1143 | 1959–61 |
| E476 | 1144 | 1959–61 |
| E477 | 1145 | 1959–61 |
| E478 | 1146 | 1959–61 |
| E479 | 1147 | 1959–61 |
| E480 | 1148 | 1959–61 |
| E481 | 1149 | 1959–61 |
| E482 | 1150 | 1959–61 |
| E483 | 1151 | 1959–61 |
| E484 | 1152 | 1959–61 |
| E485 | 1153 | 1959–61 |
| E486 | 1154 | 1959–61 |
| E487 | 1155 | 1959–61 |
| E488 | 1156 | 1959–61 |
| E489 | 1157 | 1959–61 |
| E490 | 1158 | 1959–61 |
| E491 | 1159 | 1959–61 |
| E492 | 1160 | 1959–61 |
| E493 | 1161 | 1959–61 |
| E494 | 1162 | 1959–61 |
| E495 | 1163 | 1959–61 |
| E496 | 1164 | 1959–61 |
| E497 | 1165 | 1959–61 |
| E498 | 1166 | 1959–61 |

== Illustration ==
The main picture shows no. E464 at the Salt River Depot, Cape Town, on 7 January 1966. The Series 1 locomotives served only in the SAR livery with whiskers, be it bottle green, Gulf Red or Blue Train blue.

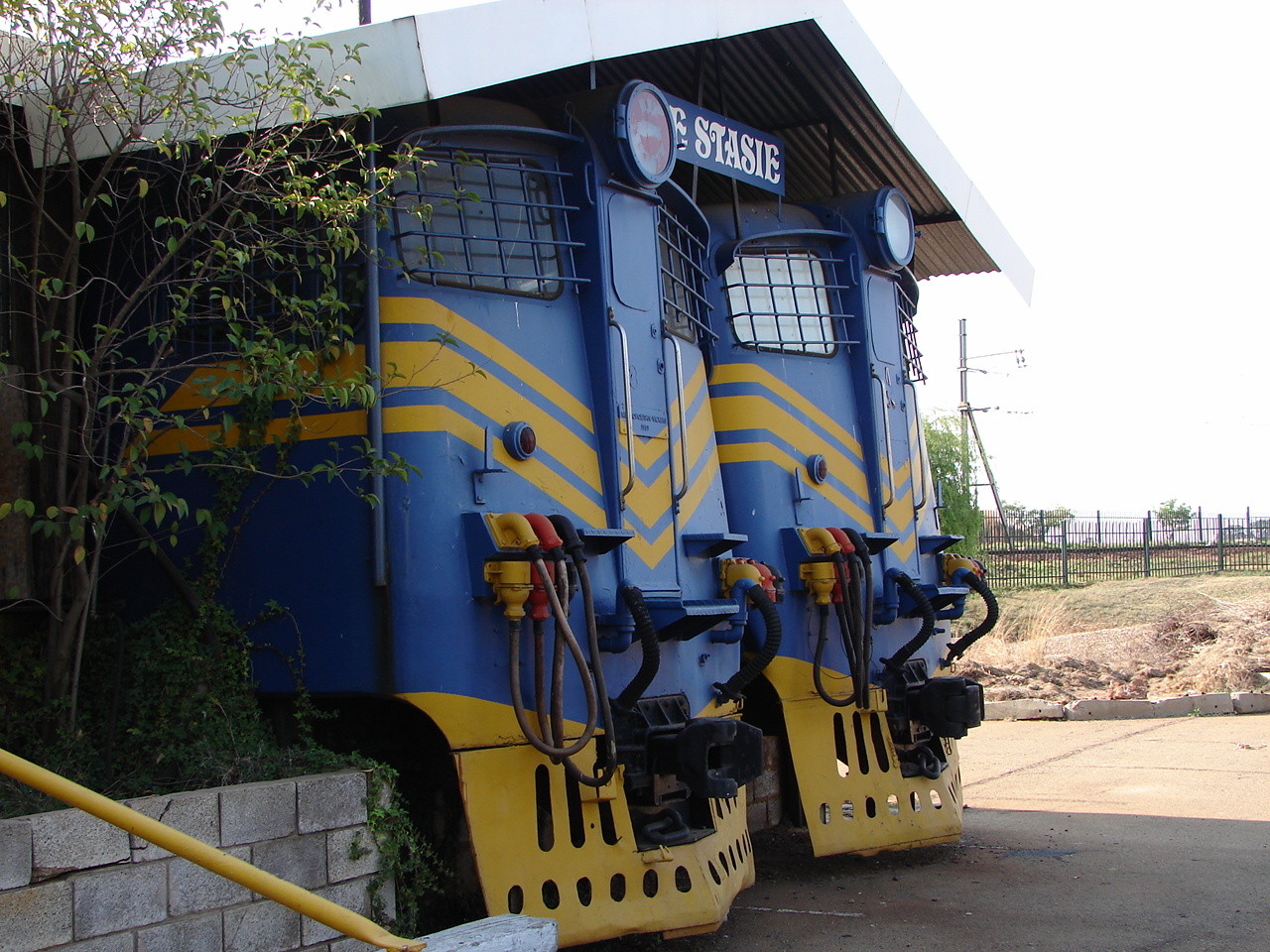
Shells of numbers E397 and E461 in SAR blue and whiskers, as clubroom at Sentrarand Depot, 22 September 2009.

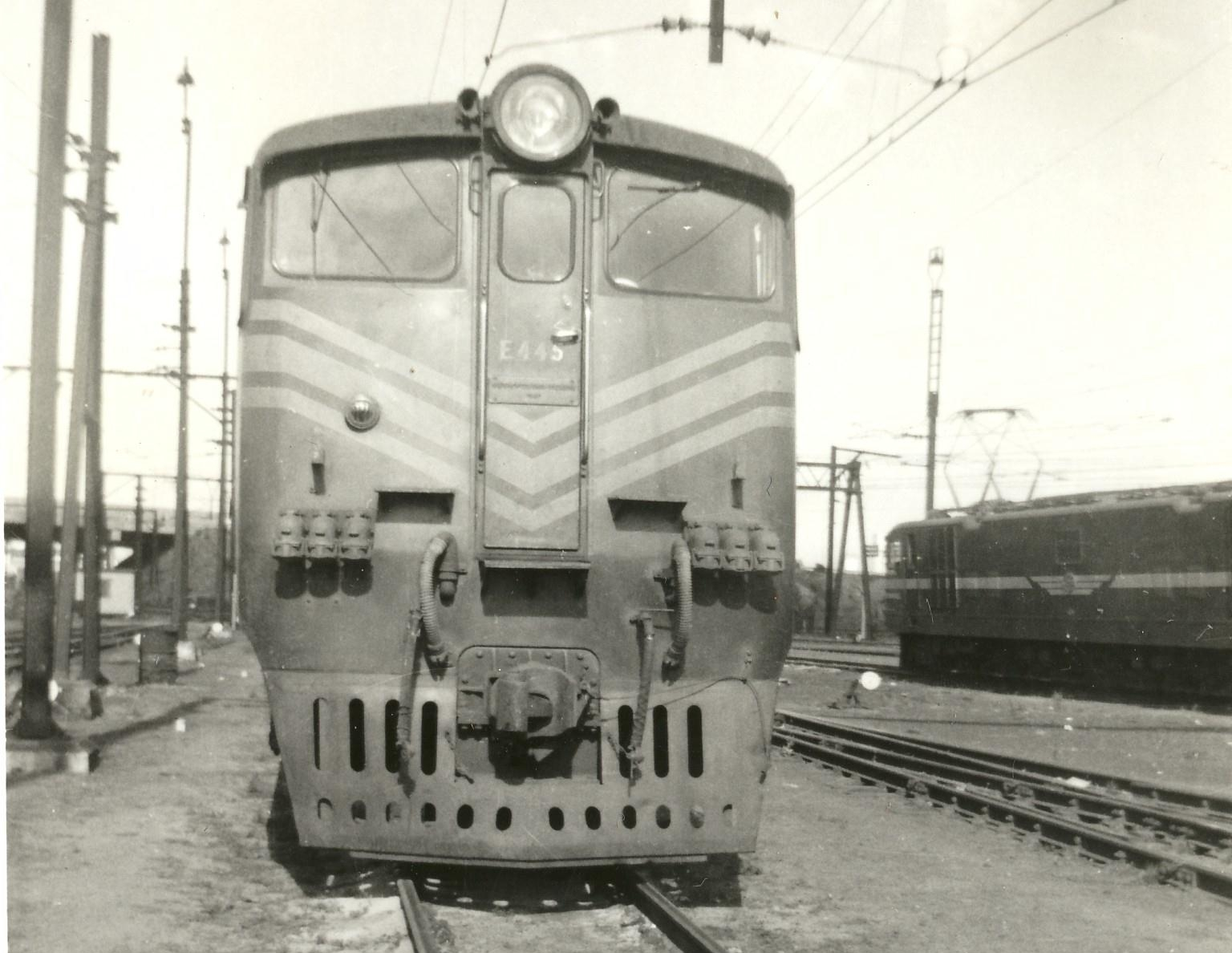
No. E445, at the time still in bottle green livery, at Salt River Depot, Cape Town, 7 January 1966.

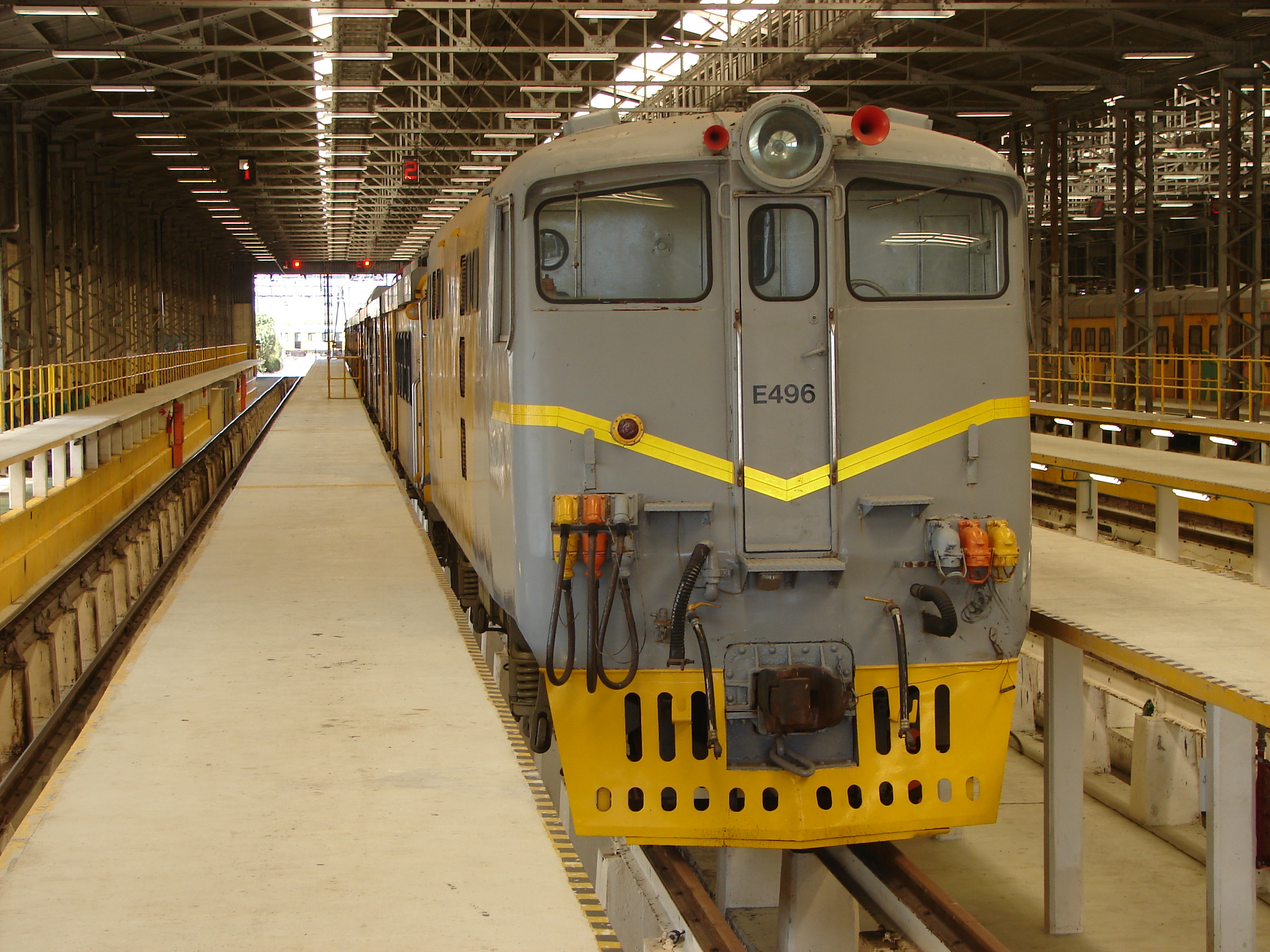
No. E496 in a MetroRail shop livery at the Salt River MetroRail Depot, Cape Town, 6 November 2014.
