= Metrovick electric vehicles =

Metropolitan-Vickers
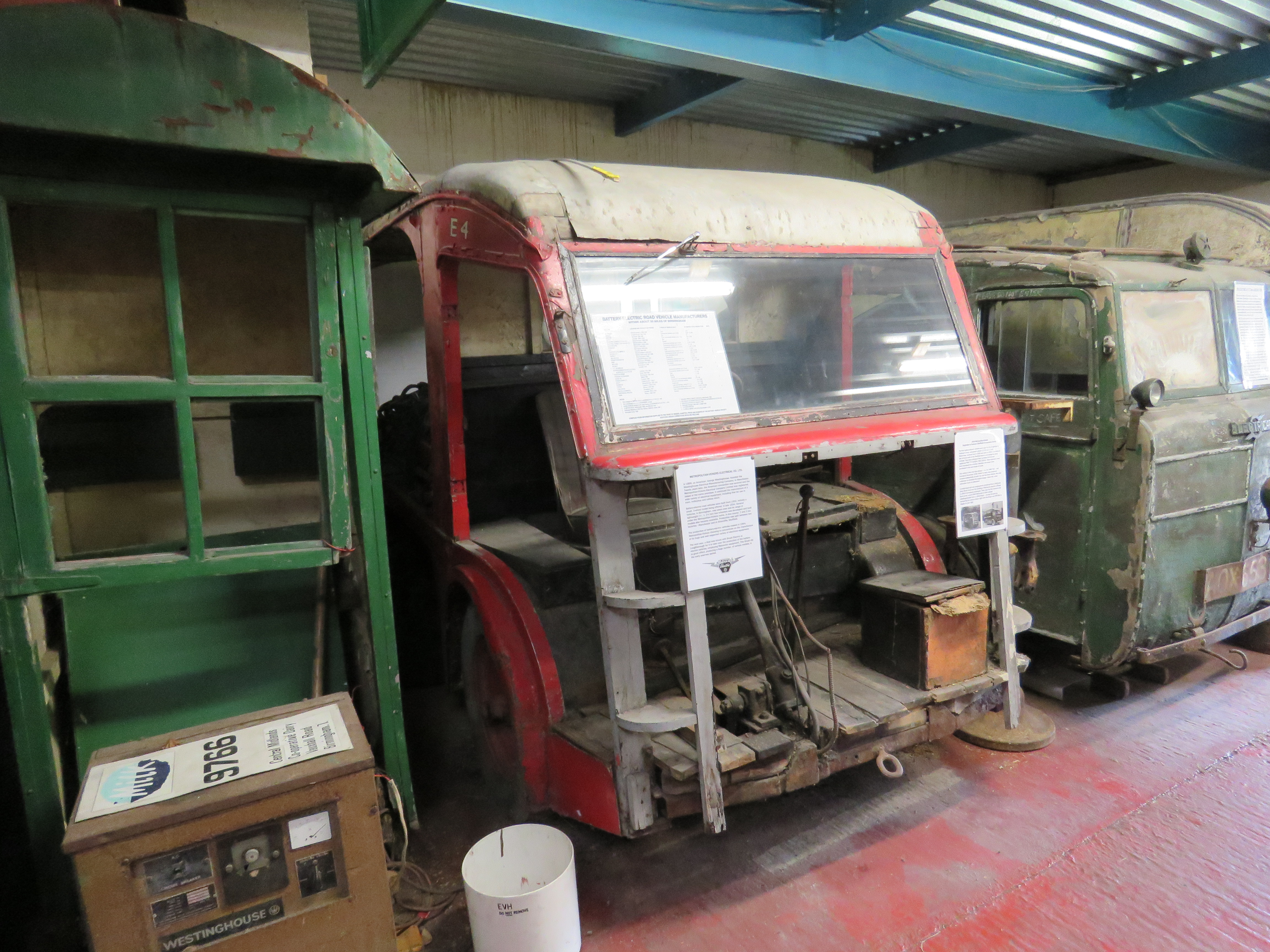
- A MetroVick 18-22 cwt milkfloat in unrestored condition at The Transport Museum, Wythall.
- Trade name: MetroVick
- Industry: Commercial Vehicles
- Predecessor: G.V. Electric (1934)
- Fate: Sold on
- Successor: Brush (1945)
- Headquarters: Manchester, England
- Products: Milk float, electric van
- Footnotes MetroVick vehicles were classified by their payload, which was measured in hundredweights, and this usage has been retained in the article. A hundredweight is one twentieth of a long ton or 51kg, and is abbreviated to "cwt".

MetroVick electric vehicles were a range of battery electric road vehicles produced by the heavy engineering company Metropolitan-Vickers between 1934 and 1944. The company was renamed Metropolitan-Vickers in 1919, and entered the electric vehicle market in 1934, when they bought up the General Vehicle Company of Birmingham. They inherited the designs for the Gordon range of models, and continued to service and supply parts for the G.V. Electric vehicles. Their main sales seem to have been of light vans and dairy vehicles, in three sizes, which they promoted through a series of exhibitions. During the Second World War, they experienced difficulties in obtaining raw materials, and the number of vehicles that could be built was severely restricted by quotas. Production of the range ceased entirely in 1944, and when hostilities ceased, they sold the electric vehicle business to Brush in 1945.

The vehicles performed well, and three vehicles are known to have survived. Two are in restored condition at Kelham Island Museum and South Yorkshire Transport Museum, while a third is at The Transport Museum, Wythall, where it is awaiting full restoration.

== History ==
The origins of Metropolitan-Vickers stem from an attempt to remove the British Westinghouse Electrical and Manufacturing Company from American control. Control of its holding company was obtained jointly by Vickers Limited of Barrow-in-Furness and the Metropolitan Carriage, Wagon and Finance Company, of Birmingham in 1917. In 1919, Vickers bought all the shares of the Metropolitan Carriage, Wagon and Finance Company, and on 8 September 1919 changed the name from British Westinghouse to Metropolitan Vickers Electrical Company, officially abbreviated to MetroVick. While their main factory was at Trafford Park in Manchester, they built a factory for the production of traction motors at Attercliffe Common, Sheffield, in 1921. By 1923 it had become a self-contained unit, producing complete locomotives and electric delivery vehicles. During the economic slump that followed the depression of 1929, spare capacity at the Sheffield factory was used to manufacture a number of new products, which included chassis for electric vehicles.

While information on who the chassis were for has not been published, in 1934 MetroVick entered the electric vehicle market, when they bought out General Vehicle Company of Birmingham, otherwise known as G.V. Electric. The deal included the manufacturing rights to the Gordon range of models. The takeover enabled MetroVick to offer a range of electric vehicles, which were manufactured in Sheffield, from large refuse collecting trucks down to vans for light deliveries. In order to provide continuity to existing G.V. users, they also undertook servicing and the supply of spare parts for those vehicles.

In early 1937, the Electric Vehicle Committee of Great Britain organised a demonstration of electric vans in Manchester, for potential customers in the north-west of England and North Wales. Besides other established names in the field, MetroVick showcased some vans, one of which had a streamlined body. Such streamlining was popular in the mid-1930s, but was not always particularly practical, as it produced a van with limited carrying capacity. Electricars also embraced the trend, which faded soon afterwards, and one of their vehicles survived into preservation, although MetroVick's did not. The Electric Vehicle Association held a similar three-day event in the car park of the Eagle Hotel in Wanstead in April 1939. By this time, MetroVick had three models in their standard range, designated as 7-9 cwt, 10-14 cwt, and 18-22 cwt. All had a single traction motor which was controlled by a foot-operated drum controller, giving six speed settings. The motor was protected from careless drivers by a safety interlock, to prevent selection of the different settings too rapidly, and the vehicles were fitted with Lockhead or Girling brakes operating on all four wheels. For situations where the vehicles were required to cover more mileage than a single charge could sustain, they included the ability to rapidly change the batteries. MetroVick intended to show one or two standard vans at the demonstration, together with a stripped-down chassis. In reporting the event, Commercial Motor carried a picture of a vehicle owned by John Barker and Company, one of a fleet of 16 such vehicles that they had bought. Much later, they reported that 18 of the MetroVick vehicles had been destroyed in 1941 by a fire caused by an incendiary bomb.

One of the larger operators of electric vehicles in the north of England at the time was the Manchester and Salford Equitable Co-operative Society, who had started buying electric vehicles in 1935, and had 82 by 1939. The fleet included twenty 10-cwt models for door to door bread delivery, a mix of MetroVicks and Morrison Electrics, although the precise split was not mentioned. The company were not at the time using MetroVicks for milk delivery, which was handled by vehicles from other manufacturers. In May 1939, MetroVick took part in an electric vehicle exhibition held at the Team Valley Trading Estate in Gateshead. In addition to displaying a 7-9 cwt van, they also showed two 18-22 cwt models, one a bare chassis and the other fitted with milk float bodywork. They also demonstrated the ventilated motor which was used on the larger chassis. Another event in June at Bolton Electricity Works largely showcased vehicles which were operational in the vicinity, and for MetroVick, this included a 10-14 cwt milk float. When war broke out, Commercial Motor sang the praises of electric vehicles, as they did not use imported fuel, but rather electricity derived from coal-fired power stations. The article noted that MetroVick had recently supplied twelve of their 18-22 cwt models fitted with dairy bodywork using insulated panels for use in the hotter climate of Malta.

The Electric Vehicle Association held their fourth annual exhibition in Manchester in 1940, where MetroVick showed their 7-9 cwt van, a larger 25-30 cwt general purpose van, and their 18-22 cwt chassis. The small vehicle, which could carry a payload of between 6.5 and 9.5 cwt, could cover 60 miles (97 km) with limited numbers of stops, and 40 miles (64 km) when stopping eight times per mile (5 per km). The standard battery contained 30 cells with a capacity of 193 amp-hours. Commercial Motor carried no news of further exhibitions after mid-1940, but in 1943 reported the MetroVick had supplied nine electric mail vans to the Post Office for use in Manchester. They were designed for a maximum payload of 8 cwt, and with a crew of two people, could cover 42 miles (68 km) on a single charge.

Like many manufacturers, MetroVick struggled to obtain raw materials during the Second World War, while production of vehicles was also severely restricted. They ceased to manufacture electric vehicles in 1944, and when hostilities ceased, they sold their electric vehicle business to Brush in 1945. As a consequence, early Brush models are almost indistinguishable from the later MetroVick models.

=== Preservation ===
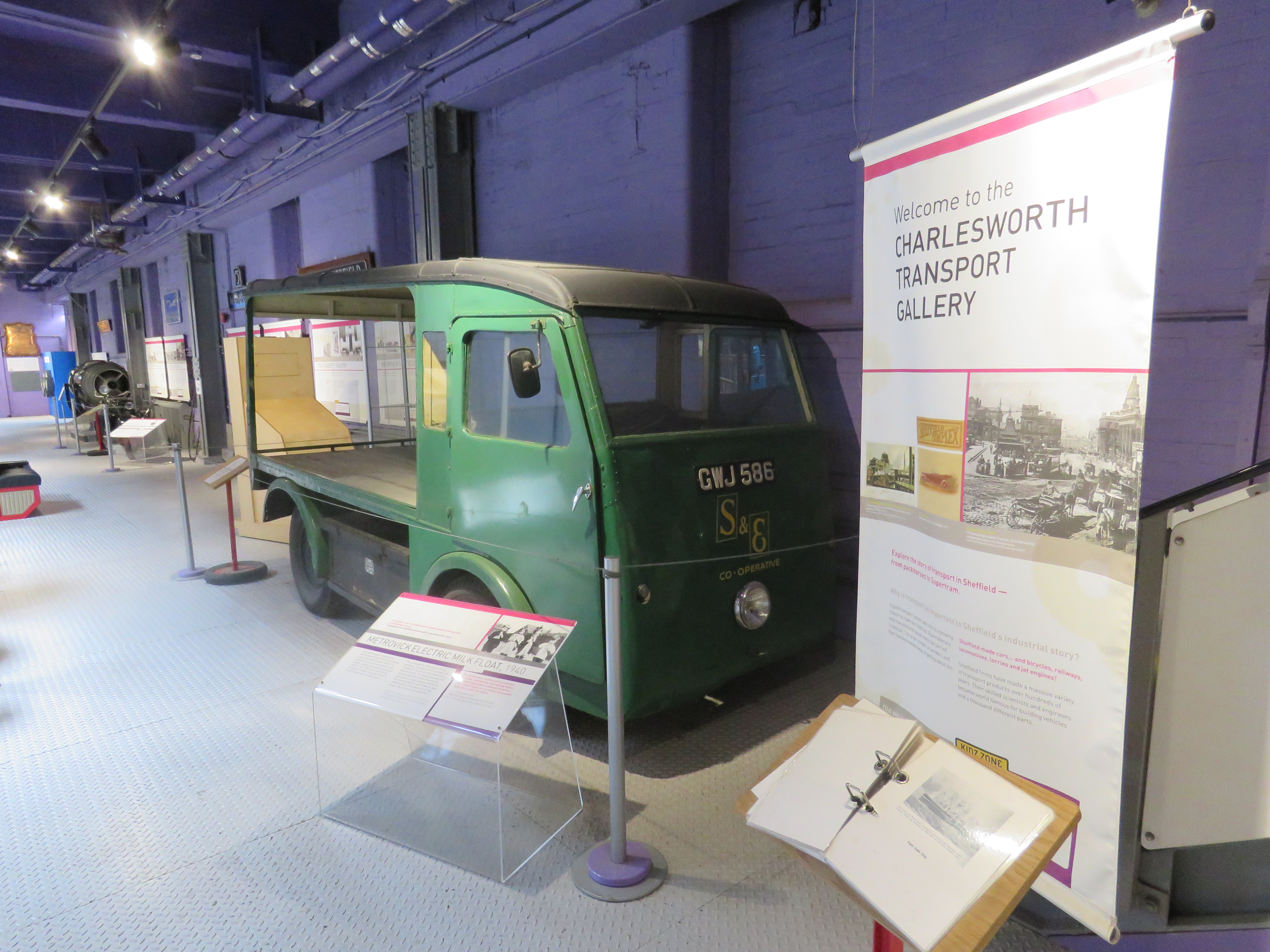
A MetroVick milk float from the 1940s at Kelham Island Museum

Three MetroVick milk floats have survived into preservation. All were operated by dairies in Sheffield, close to MetroVick's factory. Kelham Island Museum have an 18-22 cwt model, supplied to the Sheffield and Eccleshall Co-operative Society in 1940, and used by them until the 1990s. It was then given to the museum, who used it to move things around the museum site, prior to it becoming a static exhibit. It carries a green livery, and the registration number GWJ 586. A second Sheffield and Eccleshall Co-op vehicle is displayed at the South Yorkshire Transport Museum in Aldwarke, Rotherham. It dates from 1940, and carries the registration number GWE 606. The third is another 18-22 cwt model, supplied as part of the first batch of 36 electric vehicles bought by the Brightside and Carbrook Co-operative Society in 1938. It carries the registration number FWB 784, and remained in commercial service until the early 1970s. After withdrawal, it was donated to an enthusiast in Sheffield and spent some time at the Sheffield Bus Museum, before moving to The Transport Museum, Wythall in 1997. Major restoration work is required, but meanwhile it is on public display in its unrestored state.

== Bibliography ==
- Desmond, Kevin (2020). Electric Trucks. Jefferson, North Carolina: McFarland and Company. ISBN 978-1-4766-7615-9.
- Dummelow, John (1949). Metropolitan-Vickers Electrical Co. Ltd. 1899-1949. Metropolitan-Vickers Electrical Company. Archived from the original on 10 March 2023.
- Scott, J.D. (1963). Vickers: A History. London: George Weidenfeld and Nicolson.
