= E610 =

E610 may refer to:

- E610, the storage tank that caused the Bhopal disaster
- The SPV E610, a model of Orange SPV
- E610, a train of the South African Class 5E1, Series 2
