= Type 80 =

Type 80 may refer to:

- Type 80 main battle tank, a Chinese tank
- Type 80 air-to-ship missile, a Japanese ASM
- Type 80 (pistol), a Chinese military pistol
- Type 80 machine pistol, a Thai copy of the Star Model A
- Type 80 machine gun, a Chinese copy of the Soviet PK machine gun
- Type 80 torpedo, a Japanese submarine-launched homing torpedo

== See also ==
- Class 80 (disambiguation)
