= British Rail Class 80 =

Prototype 25 kV AC electric locomotive

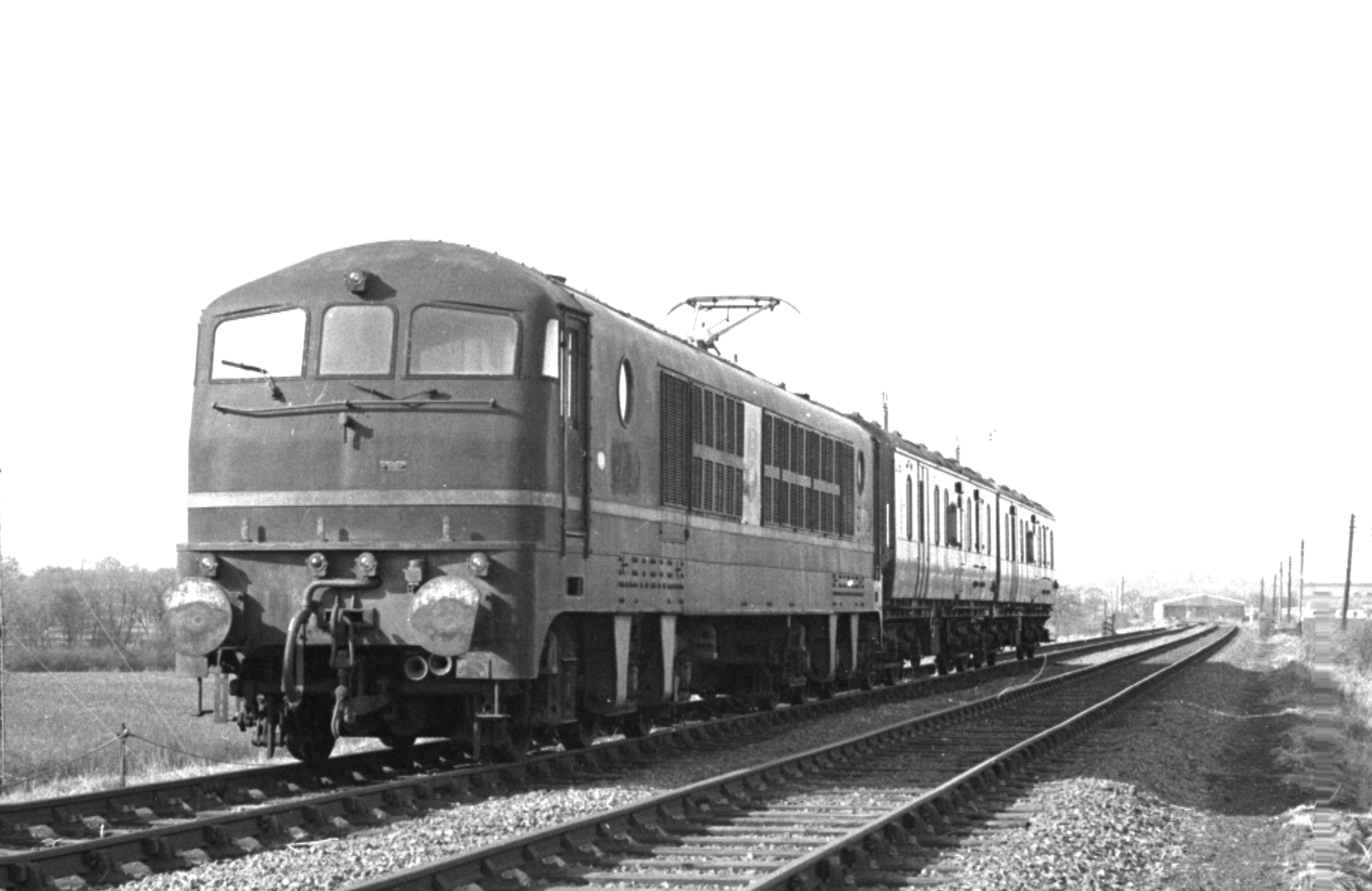
Type and origin
- Power type: Electric
- Builder: Metropolitan-Vickers
- Build date: 1951; rebuilt 1958
Specifications
- Configuration
  - UIC: (A1A)′(A1A)′
  - Commonwealth: A1A-A1A
- Gauge: 4 ft 8 1/2 in (1,435 mm) standard gauge
- Wheel diameter: 3 ft 8 in (1.118 m)
- Length: 56 ft 6 in (17.22 m)
- Width: 8 ft 8 1/4 in (2.65 m)
- Height: 12 ft 10 in (3.91 m)
- Loco weight: 109 long tons (110.7 t; 122.1 short tons)
- Electric system/s: 25 kV AC Catenary
- Current pickups: Stone-Faiveley ‘V’-type pantograph, 1 off Mercury-arc rectifiers
- Traction motors: Metropolitan-Vickers, 4 off
- Train heating: Electric Train Heating
- Train brakes: Vacuum
Performance figures
- Maximum speed: 90 mph (145 km/h)
- Tractive effort: 40,000 lbf (178,000 N)
Career
- Operators: British Rail
- Numbers: E1000; E2001 from 1959
- Axle load class: Route availability
- Retired: April 1968
- Disposition: Scrapped

Class 80 was the TOPS classification allocated by British Rail to the prototype 25 kV AC electric locomotive. This locomotive was built by Metropolitan-Vickers, initially as a prototype gas turbine–electric locomotive, numbered 18100. British Rail allocated the number E1000 (and later E2001) to the locomotive following its conversion from gas turbine propulsion.

== Conversion ==
Its new electric propulsion meant it was rated at 2,500 hp (1,900 kW), giving a maximum speed of 90 mph (145 km/h) and weighing 109 long tons (110.7 t; 122.1 short tons). In addition, it was also converted from Co-Co to A1A-A1A wheel arrangement when the centre traction motor from each bogie was removed. The new traction motor rating (with four motors) was about the same as the original rating (with six motors). This suggests that new traction motors were fitted.

The conversion of the locomotive began in January 1958 when the locomotive was moved from storage at Dukinfield Works to the Bowesfield Works at Stockton-on-Tees. The work involved the removal of the gas turbine unit, main generator, fuel tank, air filters, the centre traction motor from each bogie and all of the ancillary equipment used for the gas turbine unit.

Once the locomotive had been stripped, the new electrical equipment was installed which included the transformer, the Stone-Faiveley pantograph (for which a section of the roof had to be lowered), a Brown Boveri air blast circuit breaker and the Hackbridge-Hewittic mercury arc rectifier units.

The cabs of the locomotive were converted from Western Region right-hand drive to the standard British Rail left-hand drive arrangement. The rebuilt locomotive was completed and ready for trials in October 1958. It retained its original BR black livery, with a silver stripe around the middle of the body and silver numbers.

== Usage ==
The locomotive was used from late 1958 initially between Wilmslow and Mauldeth Road on the London Midland Region main line. It was used only for the training of drivers and the testing of equipment until completion of the electrification of the 31 miles between Crewe and Manchester and the delivery of electric locomotives now on order.

== Withdrawal ==
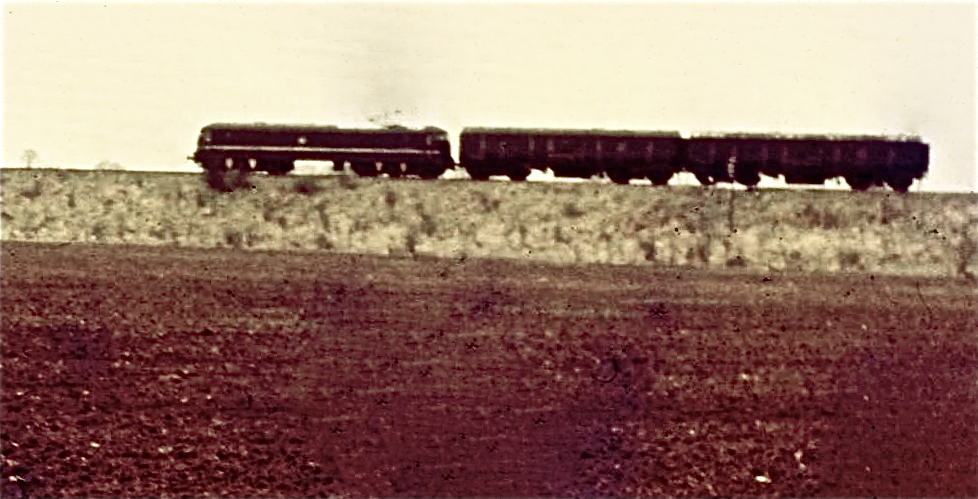
When this photo was taken in 1969 the class 80 was stored on the disused Great Central near Akeman Street railway station.

Once the production locomotives (Class 81 onwards) were in service, E2001 was no longer required. It was put into store at the end of 1961, and lasted for over ten years at various locations. It was officially withdrawn in April 1968 and scrapped in November 1972 at J Cashmore in Great Bridge.

== Models ==
E1000/E2001 is being made as a kit and a ready-to-run model in OO gauge by Silver Fox Models.

An exclusive edition was made by Heljan for Rails of Sheffield in OO gauge.
