= South African Class 5E1, Series 2 =

Type of electric locomotive

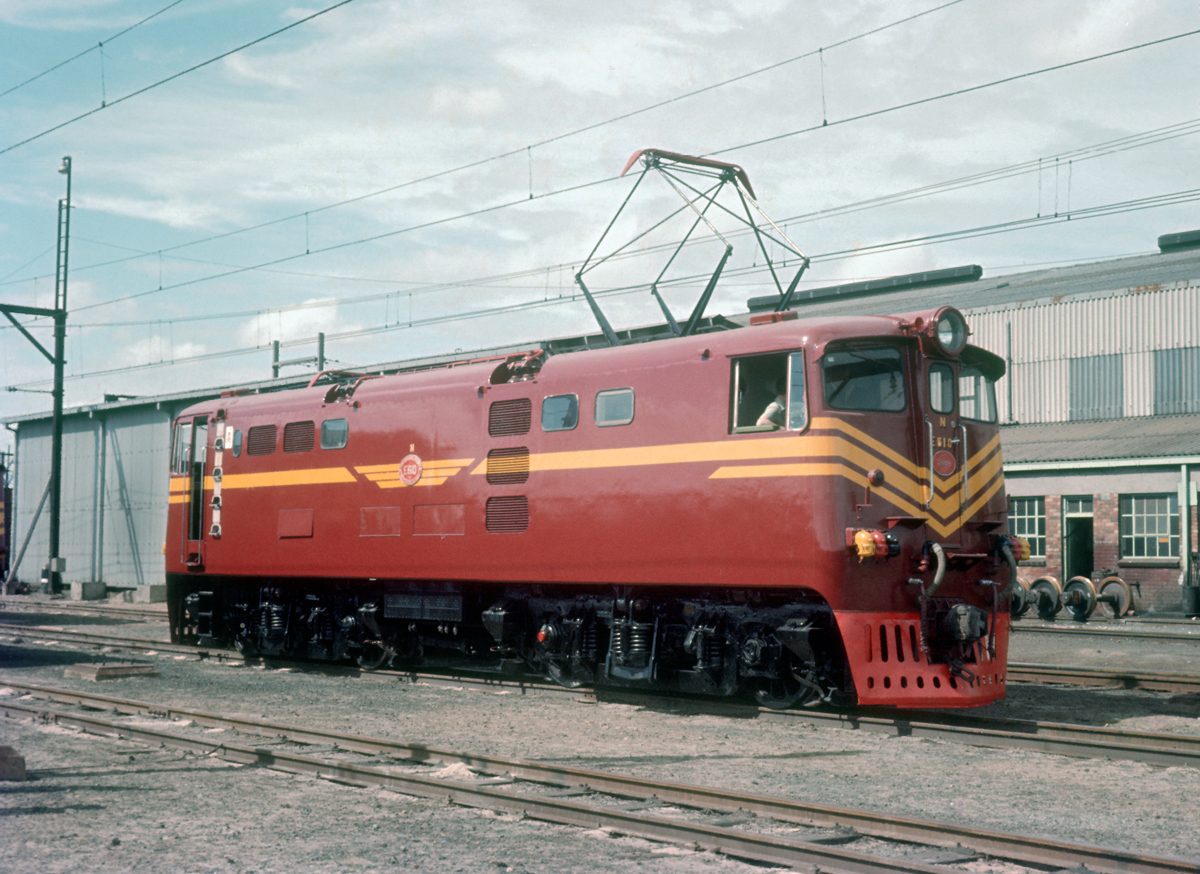
- No. E610 at Paardeneiland Depot, 11 April 1970
Type and origin
- Power type: Electric
- Designer: Metropolitan-Vickers
- Builder: Union Carriage & Wagon
- Model: MV 5E1
- Build date: 1963
- Total produced: 130
Specifications
- Configuration
  - AAR: B-B
  - UIC: Bo'Bo'
  - Commonwealth: Bo-Bo
- Gauge: 3 ft 6 in (1,067 mm) Cape gauge
- Wheel diameter: 48 inches (1,220 mm)
- Wheelbase: 444 inches (11,280 mm)
  - Bogie: 11 ft 3 1/16 in (3,430 mm)
- Pivot centres: 25 ft 9 in (7,849 mm)
- Panto shoes: 22 ft 10 1/2 in (6,972 mm)
- Length
  - Over couplers: 50 ft 10 in (15,494 mm)
  - Over beams: 48 feet (14,630 mm)
- Width: 9 ft 6 in (2,896 mm)
- Height
  - Pantograph: 13 ft 5 in (4,089 mm)
  - Body height: 12 ft 11 in (3,937 mm)
- Axle load: 47,600 lb (21,591 kg)
- Adhesive weight: 190,400 lb (86,364 kg)
- Loco weight: 190,400 lb (86,364 kg)
- Electric system/s: 3 kV DC catenary
- Current pickup(s): Pantographs
- Traction motors: Four AEI 281 AZX
  - Rating 1 hour: 650 hp (485 kW)
  - Continuous: 488 hp (364 kW)
- Gear ratio: 18:67
- Loco brake: Air & Regenerative
- Train brakes: Vacuum
- Couplers: AAR knuckle
Performance figures
- Maximum speed: 60 mph (97 km/h)
- Power output
  - 1 hour: 2,600 hp (1,940 kW)
  - Continuous: 1,953 hp (1,456 kW)
- Tractive effort
  - Starting: 56,000 lbf (250 kN)
  - 1 hour: 41,000 lbf (184 kN)
  - Continuous: 27,000 lbf (122 kN) @ 25 mph (40 km/h)
Career
- Operators: South African Railways; Spoornet
- Class: Class 5E1
- Number in class: 130
- Numbers: E591-E720
- Delivered: 1963-1964
- First run: 1963

The South African Railways Class 5E1, Series 2 of 1963 was an electric locomotive.

In 1963 and 1964 the South African Railways placed 130 Class 5E1, Series 2 electric locomotives with a Bo-Bo wheel arrangement in mainline service. These were the first electric locomotives to be built in South Africa in quantity.

== Manufacturer ==
Series 2 of the Metropolitan-Vickers (Metrovick)-designed 3 kV DC Class 5E1 electric locomotive was built for the South African Railways (SAR) by Union Carriage and Wagon (UCW) in Nigel, Transvaal, with the electrical equipment being supplied by Associated Electrical Industries (AEI).

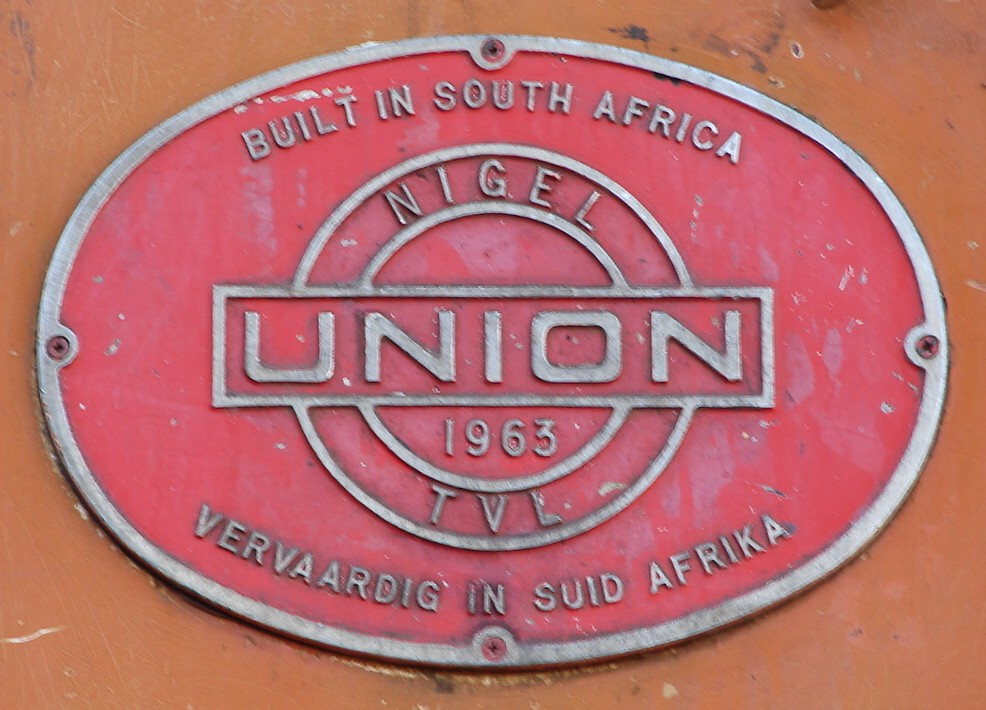
Builer's plate

UCW, at the time Australian-owned, had opened its works at Nigel in 1959 and the building of the Class 5E1, Series 2 was its first large locomotive order.

It did not allocate builder's numbers to the locomotives it built for the SAR, but used the SAR unit numbers for record keeping. The Series 2 locomotives were all built in 1963 and were numbered in the range from E591 to E720.

No. E591, the series leader, was officially handed over to the SAR in January 1963 as the first mainline electric locomotive constructed in South Africa.

== Identifying features ==
The locomotive had two cut-outs on the roofline on the roof access ladder side, but an unbroken roofline on the opposite side. Like the predecessor Class 5E, the Class 5E1, Series 1 and 2 had two rectangular access panels on the lower sides above the battery box, but they also had an additional rectangular panel on the lower sides above the second axle from the left.

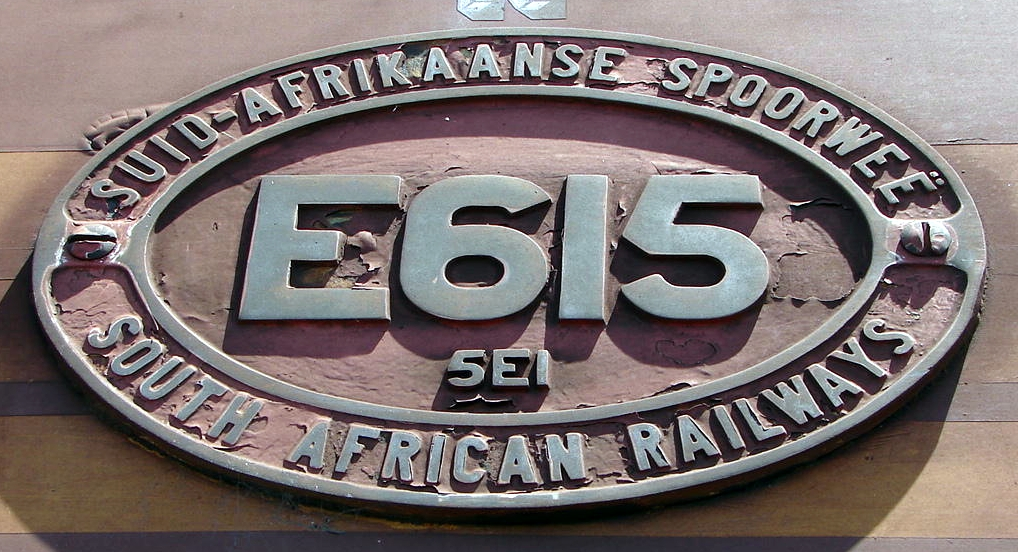
Builer's plate

The Series 1 and 2 locomotives could be distinguished from each other by the builder's plates on their end doors, a rectangular Metropolitan-Vickers plate on Series 1 locomotives and an oval Union Carriage and Wagon plate on Series 2. The Series 3, 4 and 5 locomotives could be visually distinguished from earlier models by their three small square access panels on the lower sides above the battery box instead of the two larger rectangular panels on the Series 1 and 2 locomotives.

== Traction motor bearings ==
The axle-hung traction motors of all earlier SAR electric locomotives were suspended on the axles by means of plain oil-lubricated bearings consisting of bronze shells with white metal linings. After the introduction of the more powerful Class 5E1, Series 1, considerable trouble was experienced due to flaking of the white metal linings as a result of the increased intensity of the pressure on these bearings. The use of roller bearings was investigated and one traction motor of a Class 1E was converted for trial purposes. Since satisfactory results were obtained, it was decided to alter the specifications and equip the AEI 281 AZX traction motors of these 130 UCW-built Series 2 locomotives with roller-type suspension bearings.

The arrangement consisted of a self-aligning spherical roller bearing at the pinion end and a parallel roller bearing at the commutator end of the traction motor. The bearings were grease-lubricated and were carried in a split cannon box to which the traction motor was attached by means of two clamps which engaged cylindrically-machined seatings on the outside of the housing. The roller-type suspension bearings required little attention other than the replenishment of the grease when the wheels were removed for tyre-turning.

Orders for the subsequent Class 5E1, Series 3 and later models made provision for roller suspension bearings incorporating a lip-type cylindrical roller bearing to replace the self-aligning ball bearing at the pinion end, and alternatively for tapered roller bearings at both ends. Since the external dimensions of the bearing housings would remain the same, the traction motors would still be freely interchangeable.

== Service ==
The Class 5E1 family served on all 3 kV DC electrified mainlines country-wide for almost forty years. They worked the vacuum-braked goods and mainline passenger trains over the lines radiating south, west and north of Durban almost exclusively until the mid-1970s and Class 6E1s only became regular motive power in Natal when air-braked car trains began running between Durban and the Reef. By the early 2000s the Series 2 locomotives were all withdrawn.

After withdrawal from SAR service, fifteen of the Series 2 locomotives were sold to the Middelburg, Transvaal mines of the Ingwe Coal Corporation, where three were later scrapped and the rest renumbered in the range from 5401 to 5412. The Ingwe locomotives were numbers E607, E609, E617, E630, E649, E650, E655, E661, E669, E670, E673, E675, E678, E681 and E696.

== Liveries ==
When the SAR celebrated 100 years of railways in South Africa in 1960, new colour schemes were adopted for passenger stock as well as electric and diesel-electric locomotives. Gulf Red with signal red cowcatchers was the colour initially chosen for locomotives and the yellow whiskers and stripes were carried over from the earlier green livery. As it had been on the green livery, the yellow side-stripes were initially applied to the full body-length of electric locomotives, but in the 1970s these were curtailed to just beyond the cab-sides, with the number plates on the sides still enclosed in three-stripe wings.

== Preservation ==
Currently two of the Class 5E1 Series 2 are preserved for the time being.

- Class 5E1 E613 is preserved at Bloemfontein Loco Depot as a historical monument with intentions to display her as a museum exhibit.
- Class 5E1 E615 is waiting disposal at Bellville Loco Depot.

== Illustration ==
The main picture shows no. E610 in the SAR Gulf Red and whiskers livery which was introduced in 1960 and in which the whole series was delivered. No. E613, displayed below in the pre-1960 SAR green and whiskers livery with incorrectly curtailed side-stripes and Bellville Depot’s trademark yellow cowcatchers, was repainted green in the early 1990s for use on Union Limited tourist trains.

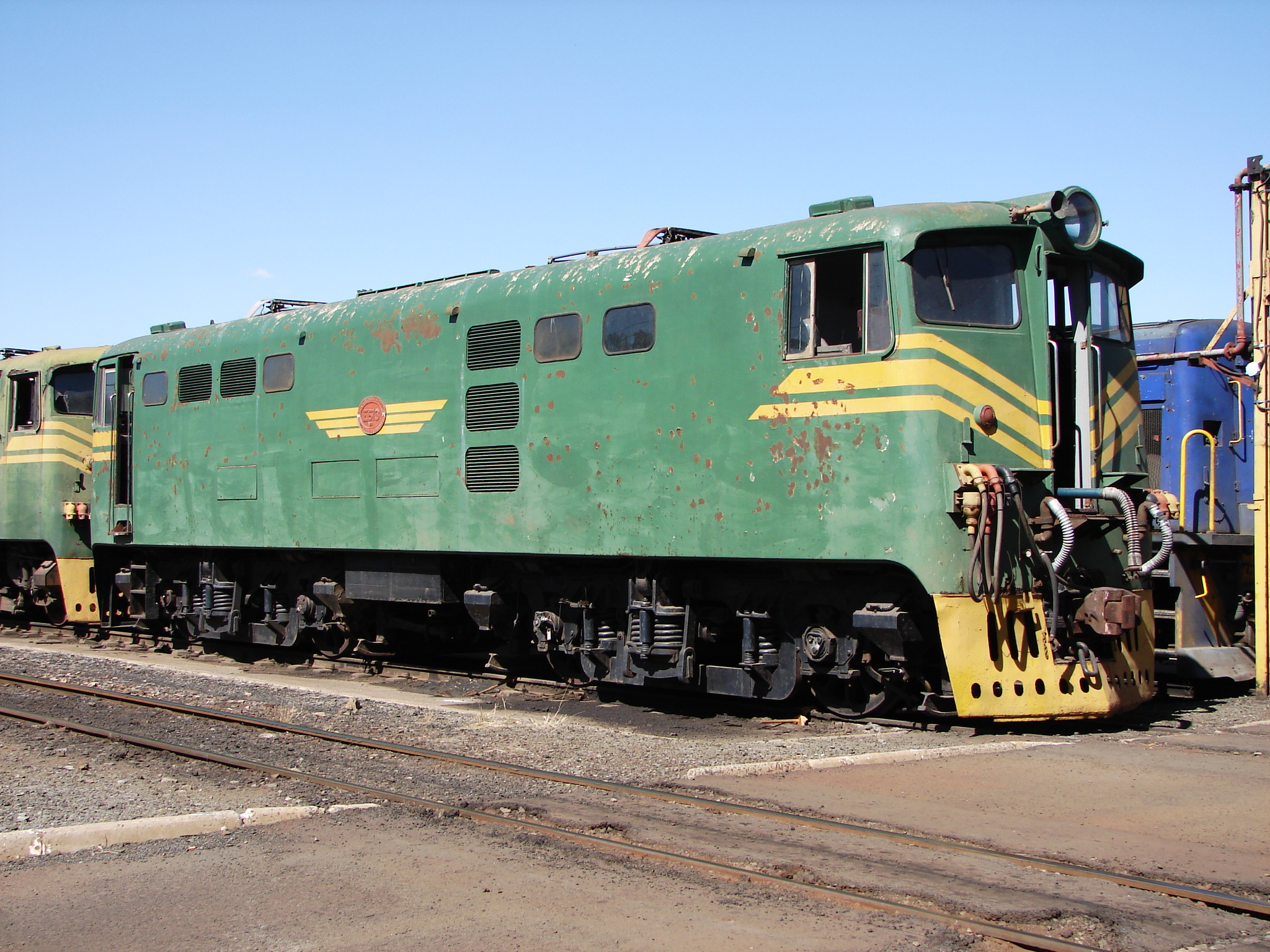
No. E613 in SAR green and whiskers at Bloemfontein, Free State, 18 September 2015

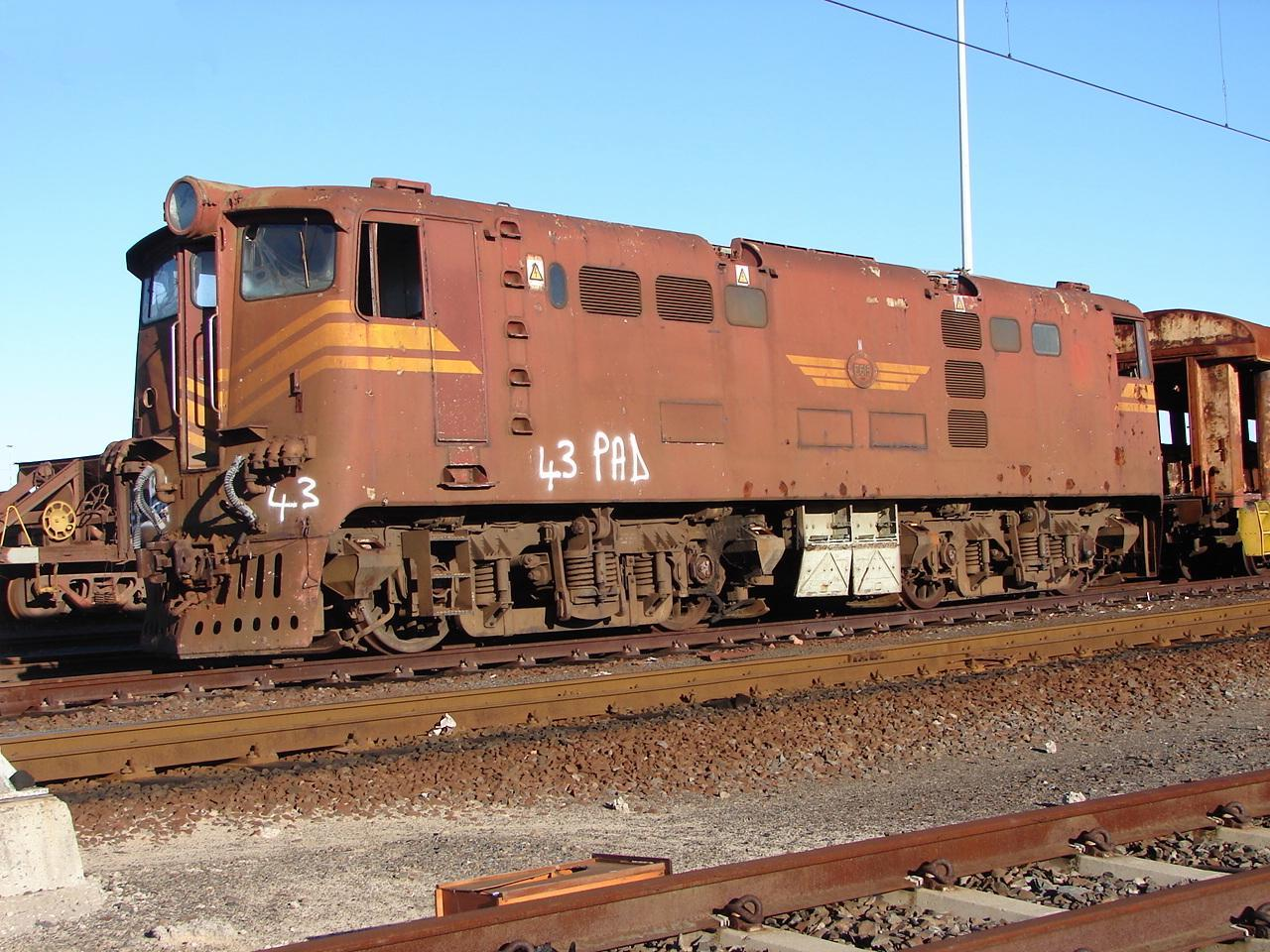
No. E615 in SAR Gulf Red and whiskers, in the Bellville Yard, Cape Town, 27 June 2009

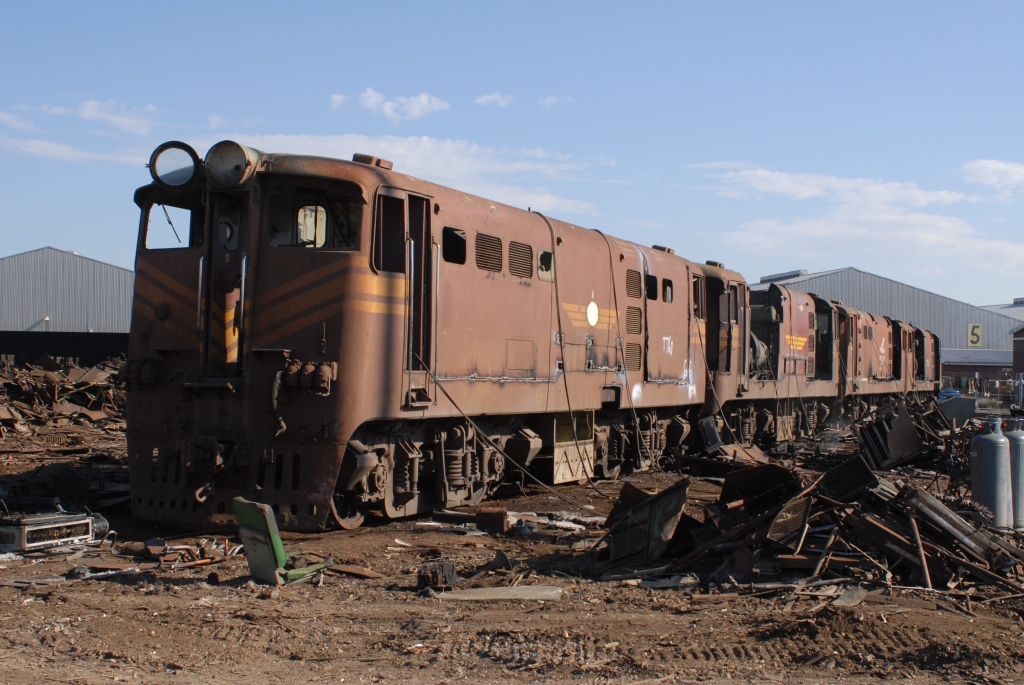
No. E616 in SAR Gulf Red and whiskers, being cut up at Danskraal, Ladysmith, 26 April 2007
