= Bowesfield Works =

Locomotive plant in Stockton-on-Tees, England

Coordinates: 54.5493°N 1.3286°W

Bowesfield Works was a railway locomotive manufacturing plant in Stockton-on-Tees. The works was operated by a joint venture company called Metropolitan Vickers-Beyer Peacock from 1949 until 1960.

== Works history ==
Metropolitan-Vickers and Beyer, Peacock & Co. formed a joint venture company in November 1949 to design and manufacture diesel, electric and gas turbine locomotives. Because Beyer, Peacock's Gorton works was still busy producing steam locomotives, an alternative site for the new locomotives to be built had to be found. A factory at Yarm Road, Stockton-on-Tees, on which Metrovicks had acquired a lease in 1947, was chosen as the location. The factory which had been built in 1946 for the American construction machinery company LeTourneau, was almost brand new, and covered an area of around 95,000 square feet (8,800 m^{2}), later extended to over 125,000 square feet (11,600 m^{2}) by Metrovicks. The works had its own railway siding running from Bowesfield Junction to the north east of the works. Initially the factory was used by Metrovicks for steel fabrication work before locomotive manufacture began in 1949.

== Locomotives built ==
=== Brazil ===
The first locomotives built at the works were fourteen electric locomotives for the Rede Mineira de Viação railway company of Brazil. They were 1,072 horsepower (799 kW), Bo-Bo, 1,000 mm (3 ft 3 3/8 in) metre gauge gauge locomotives. This was followed by another order for ten similar locomotives for Rede de Viação Paraná-Santa Catarina, Brazil.

=== Australia ===
In 1954–55, the works built forty New South Wales 46 class electric locomotives for New South Wales Railways in Australia, along with the forty-eight WAGR X class diesel electric locomotives built for Western Australian Government Railways, during 1953–56.

=== British Railways ===
The only locomotives built for British Railways at the works, were the twenty BR Class 28 diesel electrics during 1958–59, and the experimental 25 kV AC locomotive E1000 which was built by converting the gas turbine locomotive 18100. Work commenced in January 1958 when 18100 was brought to Bowesfield Works from storage at Dukinfield Works. The conversion of 18100 involved the removal of the gas turbine unit, generator and the middle traction motor from each bogie, which changed the locomotive from a Co-Co to an A1A-A1A wheel arrangement. The necessary electrical equipment such as the transformer, mercury arc rectifiers and pantograph etc. was installed, with the work completed by October 1958.

=== National Coal Board ===
In addition to building mainline locomotives, the works also constructed twelve Metropolitan-Vickers DBF type, 3 ft (914 mm) gauge, battery powered under ground mining locomotives for the National Coal Board during 1959.

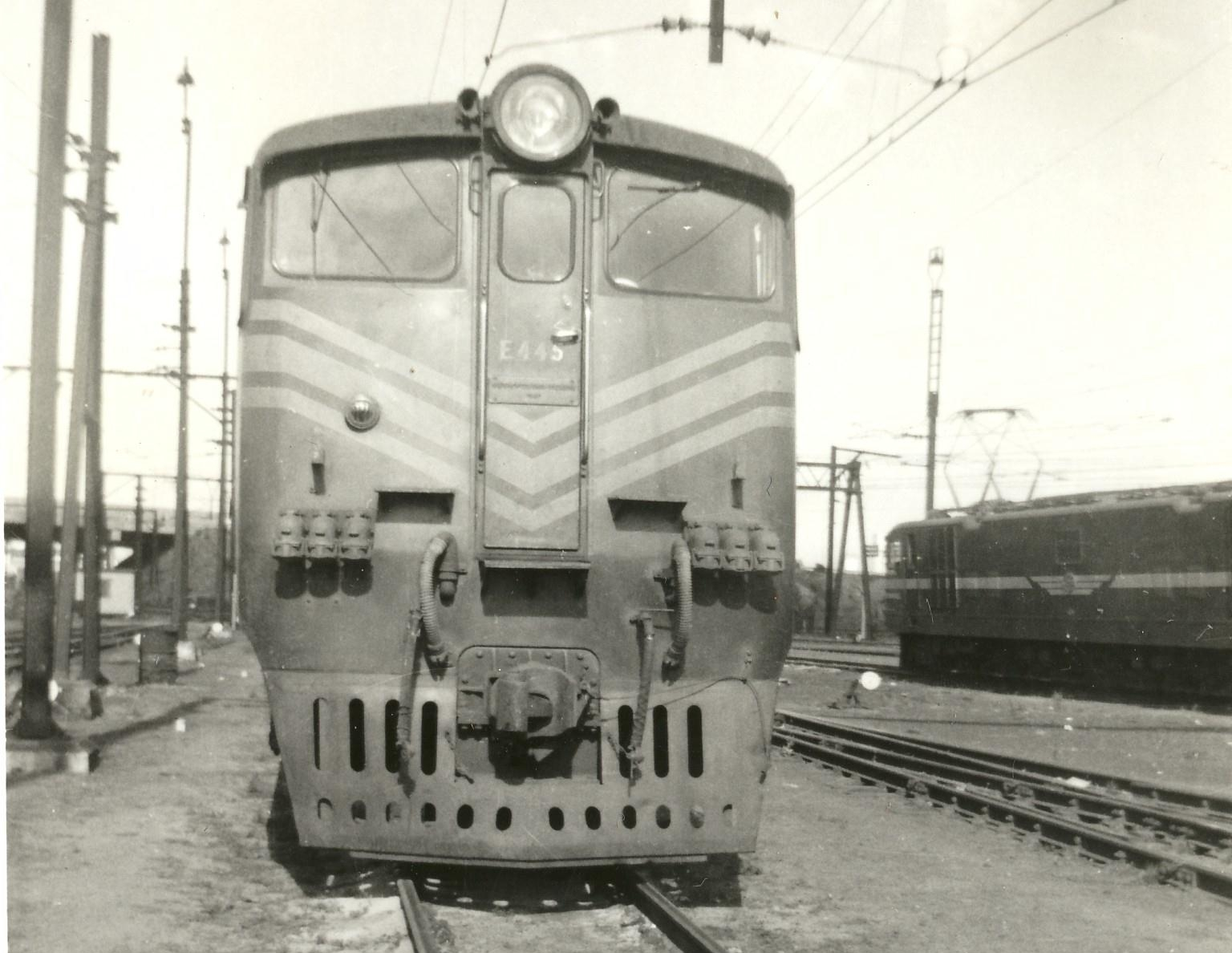
Metrovick built SAR Class 5E1, Series 1, number E445

=== South Africa ===
The last locomotives built at the works was a batch of 135, SAR Class 5E1, Series 1 electric, 2,280 horsepower (1,700 kW), 3000V d.c., Bo-Bo, 3 ft 6 in (1,067 mm) gauge locomotives for South African Railways and Harbours during 1958–60.

== Closure ==
In December 1960, it was announced that the works was facing closure due to a lack of orders, and in February 1961, the Metropolitan-Vickers-Beyer Peacock joint company was placed into voluntary liquidation. The works was closed shortly afterwards and the workforce made redundant.

== The site today ==
The factory building was taken over by the Visqueen company, a manufacturer of polythene films, which is now part of the British Polythene Industries group. The factory closed, and from 2011 the site was taken over by Bellway Homes who developed the site as their Queensgate development which features 2,3, and 4 bedroom homes.

== See also ==
- Billingham Manufacturing Plant
- Darlington Works
- Teesside Steelworks
- Hopetown Carriage Works
- Darlington TMD
- Billingham Manufacturing Plant

== Reference sources ==
- Industrial Railway Record 148, March 1997, article by R.D. Darvill (ISSN 0537-5347)
- Electric Railways 1880-1990 by Michael C. Duffy (ISBN 0852968051)
- Evening Gazette Article http://www.gazettelive.co.uk/news/teesside-news/2009/12/18/stockton-homes-plan-is-given-the-green-light-84229-25421451/
