= South Yorkshire Transport Museum =

Transport museum in South Yorkshire, England

Coordinates: 53.445362°N 1.337714°W

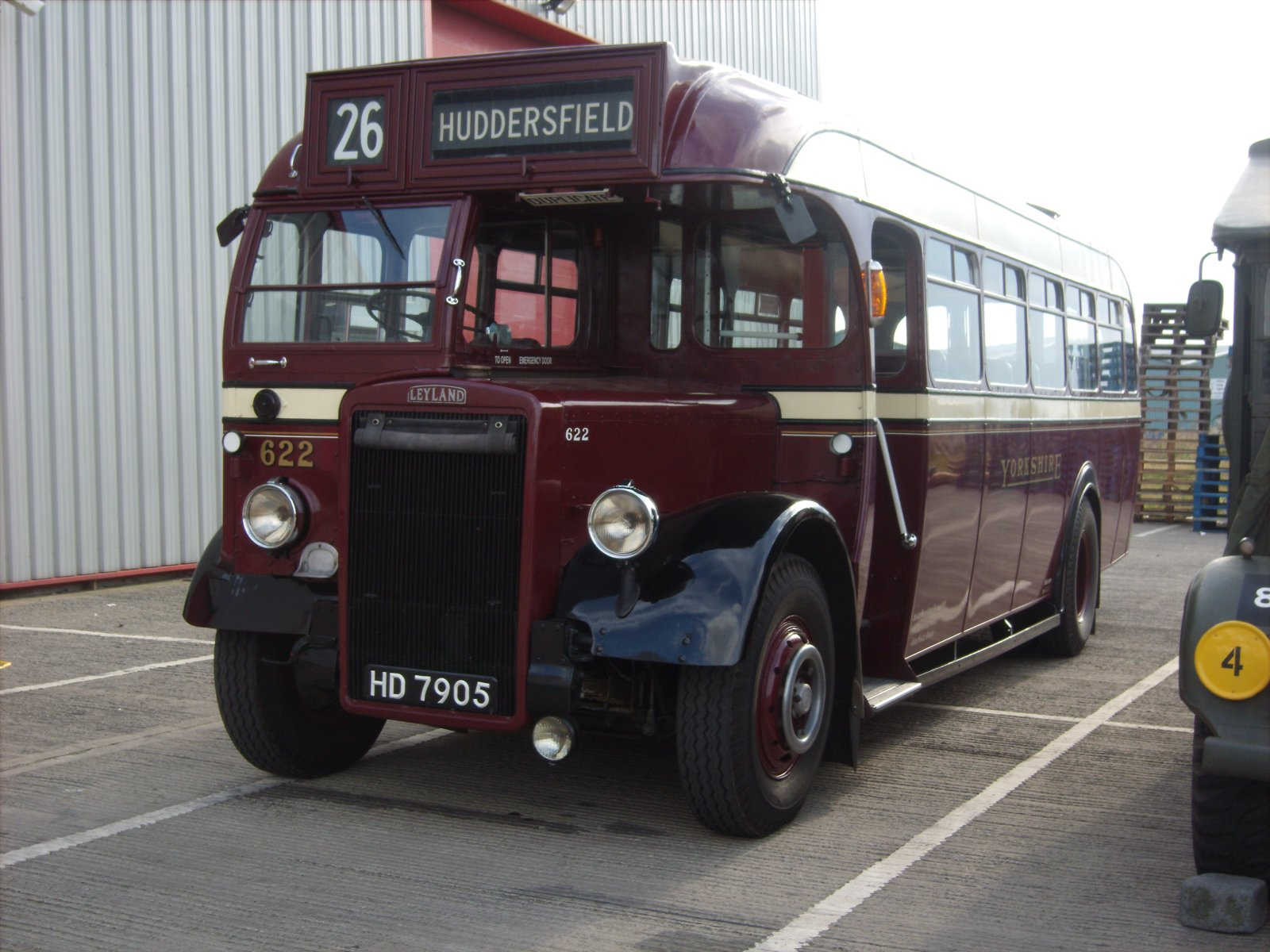
Yorkshire Woollen bus 622 on display at South Yorkshire Transport Museum

The South Yorkshire Transport Museum (SYTM) is a volunteer-owned museum of transport located in Rotherham, England. Established in 1995, it focuses on the transport history of South Yorkshire and the surrounding areas.

== Exhibits ==
Key exhibits include:

- One cab of a Class 76 electric locomotive, which hauled passenger and heavy freight trains on the Woodhead line.
- A Leyland Tiger bus, which was built in 1935 and restored for the museum by Stagecoach in 2019.

Other artefacts include bicycles, motorbikes, lorries and milk floats.

== See also ==
- South Yorkshire Transport
