= Metropolitan-Vickers =

British electrical engineering company

- Type: Private (subsidiary or joint ownership)
- Industry: Electrical engineering
- Founded: 1899 as British Westinghouse
- Founder: George Westinghouse
- Defunct: 1960; 66 years ago
- Headquarters: Manchester, England
- Area served: Worldwide
- Key people: R.S. Hilton (Managing Director)
- Products: Electrical generators, steam turbines, switchgear, transformers, electronics, electric locomotives, electric multiple unit trains, battery electric vehicles
- Parent: Associated Electrical Industries

Metropolitan-Vickers, Metrovick, or Metrovicks, was a British heavy electrical engineering company of the early-to-mid 20th century formerly known as British Westinghouse. Highly diversified, it was particularly well known for its industrial electrical equipment such as generators, steam turbines, switchgear, transformers, electronics and railway traction equipment. Metrovick holds a place in history as the builders of the first commercial transistor computer, the Metrovick 950, and the first British axial-flow jet engine, the Metropolitan-Vickers F.2. Its factory in Trafford Park, Manchester, was for most of the 20th century one of the biggest and most important heavy engineering facilities in Britain and the world.

== History ==
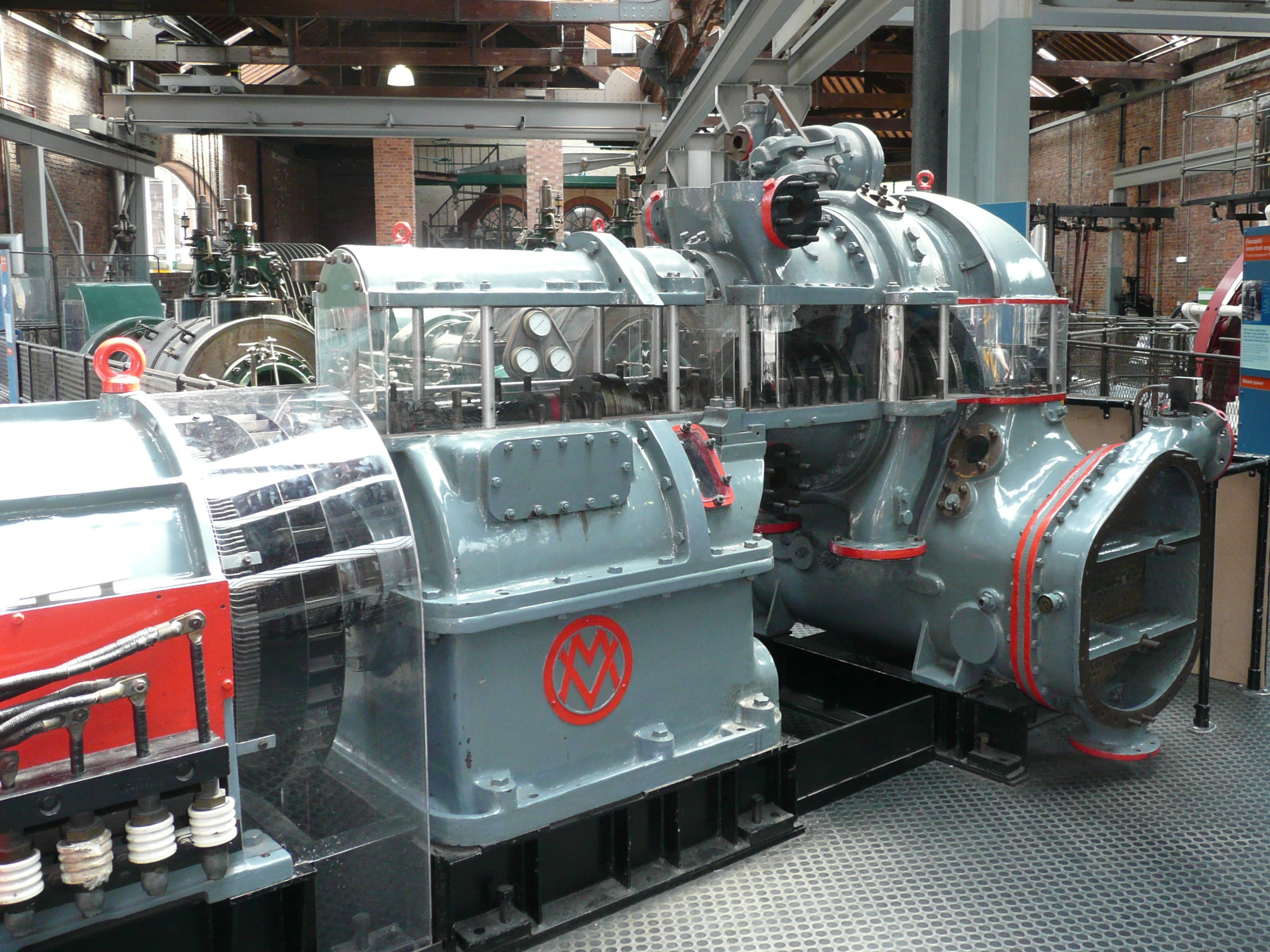
Metropolitan-Vickers 375 KW steam turbo-alternator

MV Logo from brass waveguide

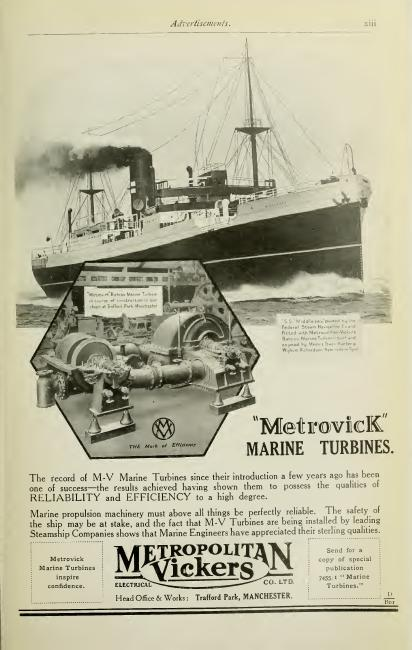
Advertisement for marine turbines in Brassey's Naval and Shipping Annual, 1923

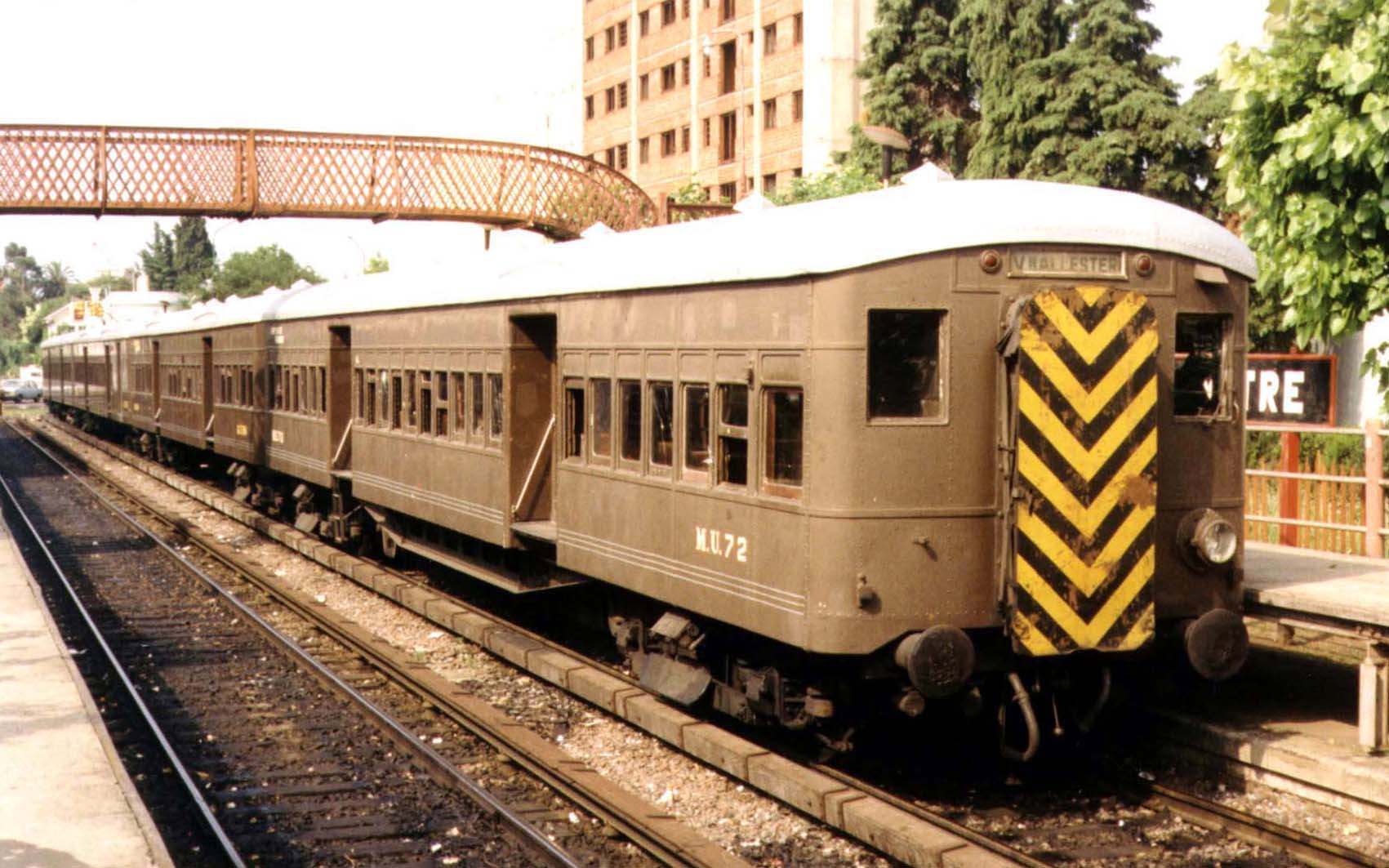
Metrovick electric multiple unit made for Central Argentine Railway in 1931. They operated until 2002.

Metrovick started as a way to separate the existing British Westinghouse Electrical and Manufacturing Company factories from United States control, which had proven to be a hindrance to gaining government contracts during the First World War. In 1917 a holding company was formed to try to find financing to buy the company's properties.

In May 1917, control of the holding company was obtained jointly by the Metropolitan Carriage, Wagon and Finance Company, of Birmingham, chaired by Dudley Docker, and Vickers Limited, of Barrow-in-Furness. On 15 March 1919, Docker agreed terms with Vickers, for Vickers to purchase all the shares of the Metropolitan Carriage, Wagon and Finance Company for almost £13 million. On 8 September 1919, Vickers changed the name of the British Westinghouse Electrical and Manufacturing Company to Metropolitan Vickers Electrical Company.

The immediate post-war era was marked by low investment and continued labour unrest. Fortunes changed in 1926 with the formation of the Central Electricity Board which standardised electrical supply and led to a massive expansion of electrical distribution, installations, and appliance purchases. Sales shot up, and 1927 marked the company's best year to date.

On 15 November 1922 the BBC was registered and the BBC's Manchester station, 2ZY, was officially opened on 375 metres transmitting from the Metropolitan Vickers Electricity works in Old Trafford.

In 1921, they bought a 9-acre (3.6 ha) site at Attercliffe Common in Sheffield, which was used to manufacture traction motors. By 1923, it had its own engineering department, and was making complete locomotives and electric delivery vehicles.

=== BTH merger and transition to AEI ===
In 1928 Metrovick merged with the rival British Thomson-Houston (BTH), a company of similar size and product lineup. Combined, they would be one of the few companies able to compete with Marconi or English Electric on an equal footing. In fact the merger was marked by poor communication and intense rivalry, and the two companies generally worked at cross purposes.

The next year the combined company was purchased by the Associated Electrical Industries (AEI) holding group, who also owned Edison Swan (Ediswan); and Ferguson, Pailin & Co, manufacturers of electrical switchgear in Openshaw, Manchester. The rivalry between Metrovick and BTH continued, and AEI was never able to exert effective control over the two competing subsidiary companies.

Problems worsened in 1929 with the start of the Great Depression, but Metrovick's overseas sales were able to pick up some of the slack, notably a major railway electrification project in Brazil. By 1933 world trade was growing again, but growth was nearly upset when six Metrovick engineers were arrested and found guilty of espionage and "wrecking" in Moscow after a number of turbines built by the company in and for the Soviet Union proved to be faulty. The British government intervened; the engineers were released and trade with Russia was resumed after a brief embargo.

During the 1930s Metropolitan Vickers produced two dozen very large diameter (3m/10 ft) three-phase AC traction motors for the Hungarian railway's V40 and V60 electric locomotives. The 1640 kW rated power machinery, designed by Kálmán Kandó, was paid for by British government economic aid.

In 1935 the company built a 105 MW steam turbogenerator, the largest in Europe at that time, for the Battersea Power Station.

In 1936 Metrovick started work with the Air Ministry on automatic pilot systems, eventually branching out to gunlaying systems and building radars the next year. In 1938 they reached an agreement with the Ministry to build a turboprop design developed at the Royal Aircraft Establishment (RAE) under the direction of Hayne Constant. It is somewhat ironic that BTH, its erstwhile partners, were at the same time working with Frank Whittle on his pioneering jet designs.

=== Wartime aircraft production ===
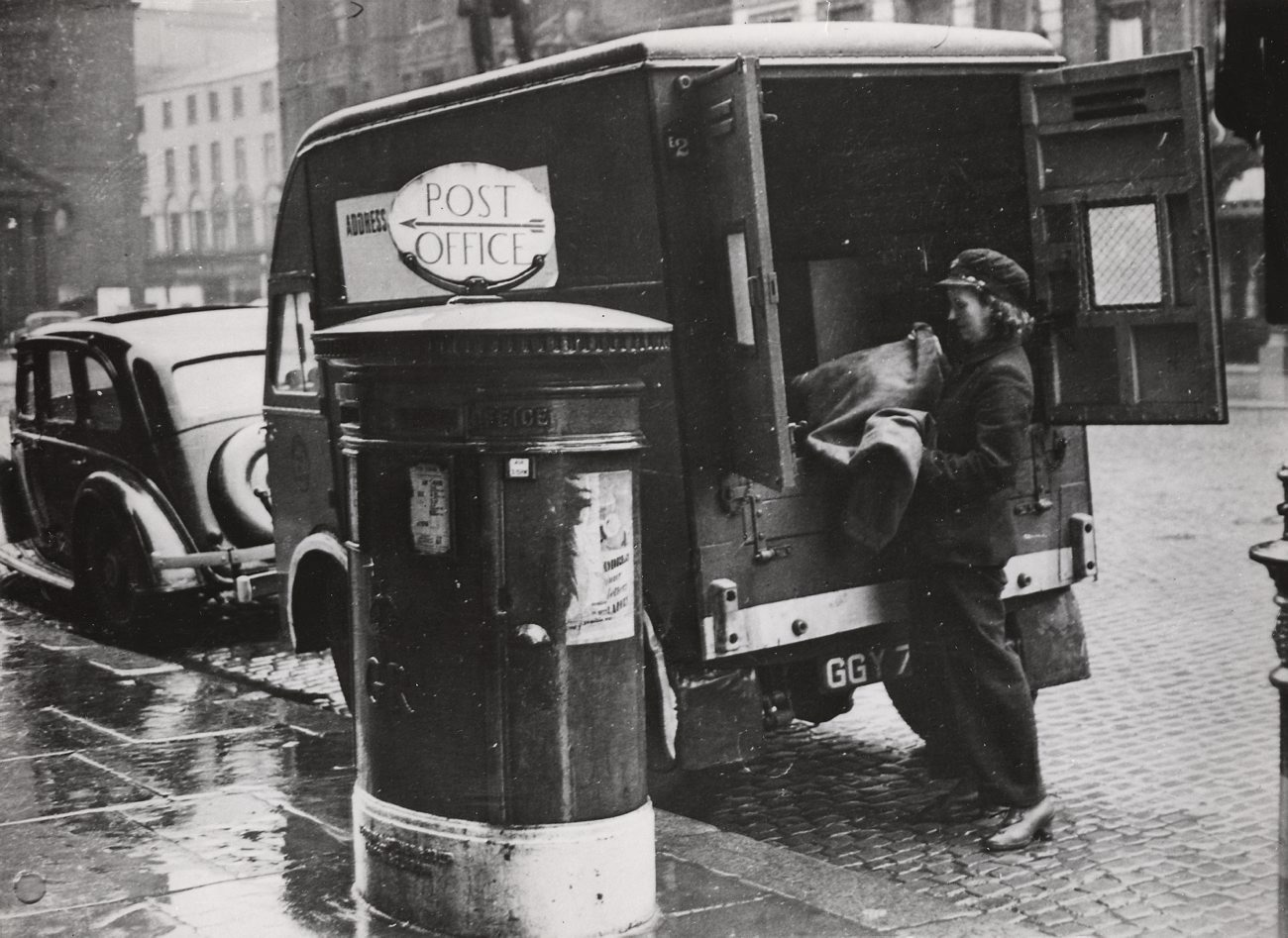
Metropolitan-Vickers 10-14 cwt postal van in Manchester, 1943

In mid-1938, MV was awarded a contract to build Avro Manchester twin-engined heavy bombers under licence from A.V. Roe. As this type of work was very different from its traditional heavy engineering activities, a new factory was built on the western side of Mosley Road and this was completed in stages through 1940. There were significant problems producing this aircraft, not least being the unreliability of the Rolls-Royce Vulture engine and that the first 13 Manchesters were destroyed in a Luftwaffe bombing raid on Trafford Park on 23 December. Despite this the firm went on to complete 43 examples. With the design of the much improved four-engined derivative, the Avro Lancaster, MV switched production to that famous type, supplied with Rolls-Royce Merlin engines from the Ford Trafford Park shadow factory. Three hangars were erected on the southside of Manchester's Ringway Airport for assembly and testing of its Lancasters, before a policy switch was made to assembling them in a hangar at Avro's Woodford airfield. By the end of the war, MV had built 1,080 Lancasters. These were followed by 79 Avro Lincoln derivatives before remaining orders were cancelled and MV's aircraft production ceased in December 1945.

In 1940 the turboprop effort was re-engineered as a pure jet engine after the successful run of Whittle's designs. The new design became the Metrovick F.2 and eventually flew in 1943 on a Gloster Meteor. Considered to be too complex to bother with, Metrovick then re-engineered the design once again to produce roughly double the power, while at the same time starting work on a much larger design, the Metrovick F.9 Sapphire. Although the F.9 proved to be a winner, the Ministry of Supply nevertheless forced the company to sell the jet division to Armstrong Siddeley in 1947 to reduce the number of companies in the business.

In addition to building aircraft, other wartime work included the manufacture of both Dowty and Messier undercarriages, automatic pilot units, searchlights and radar equipment. They also produced electric vans and lorries.

=== Metrovick postwar ===
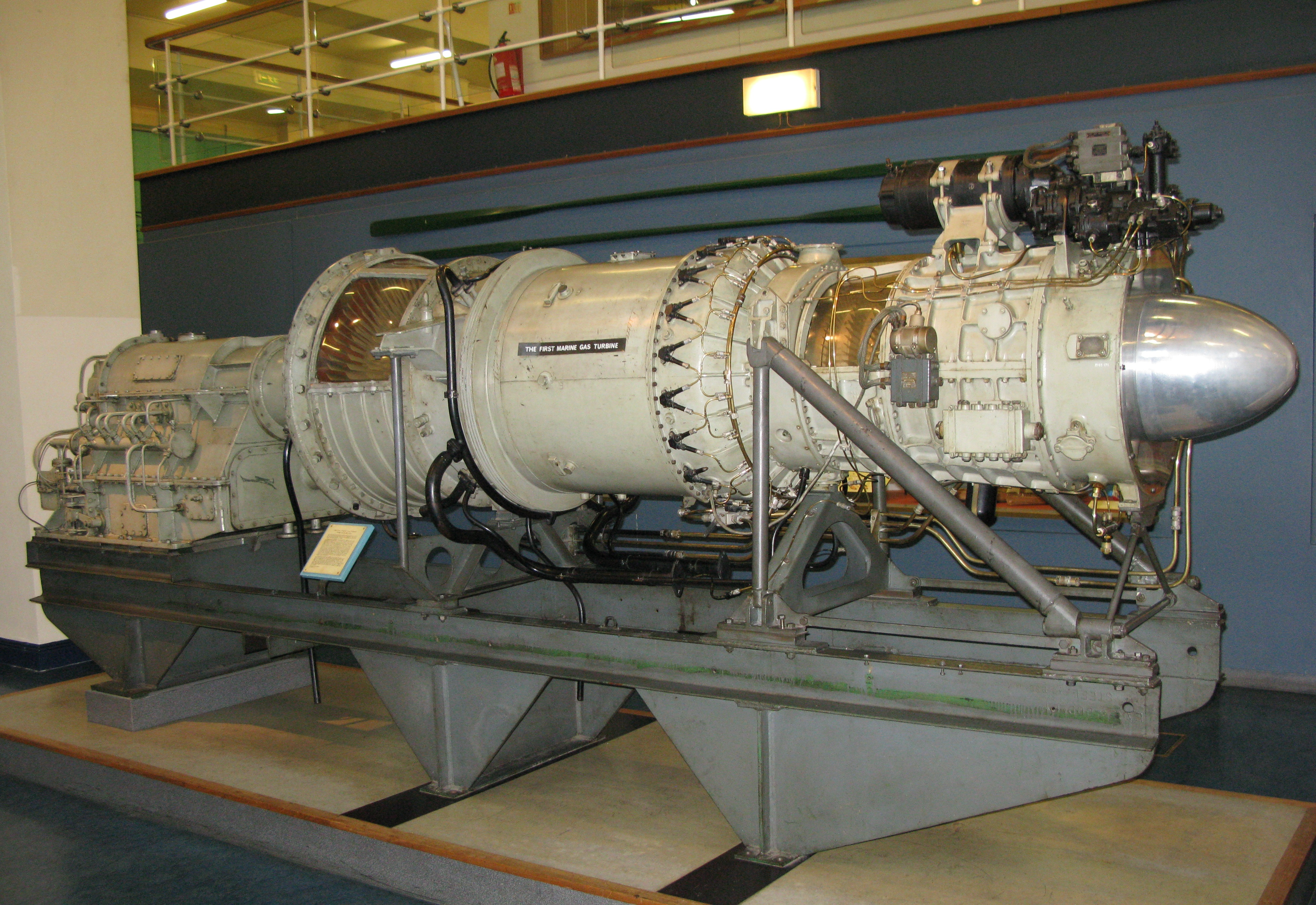
The Metrovick G.1 Gatric gas turbine from MGB 2009

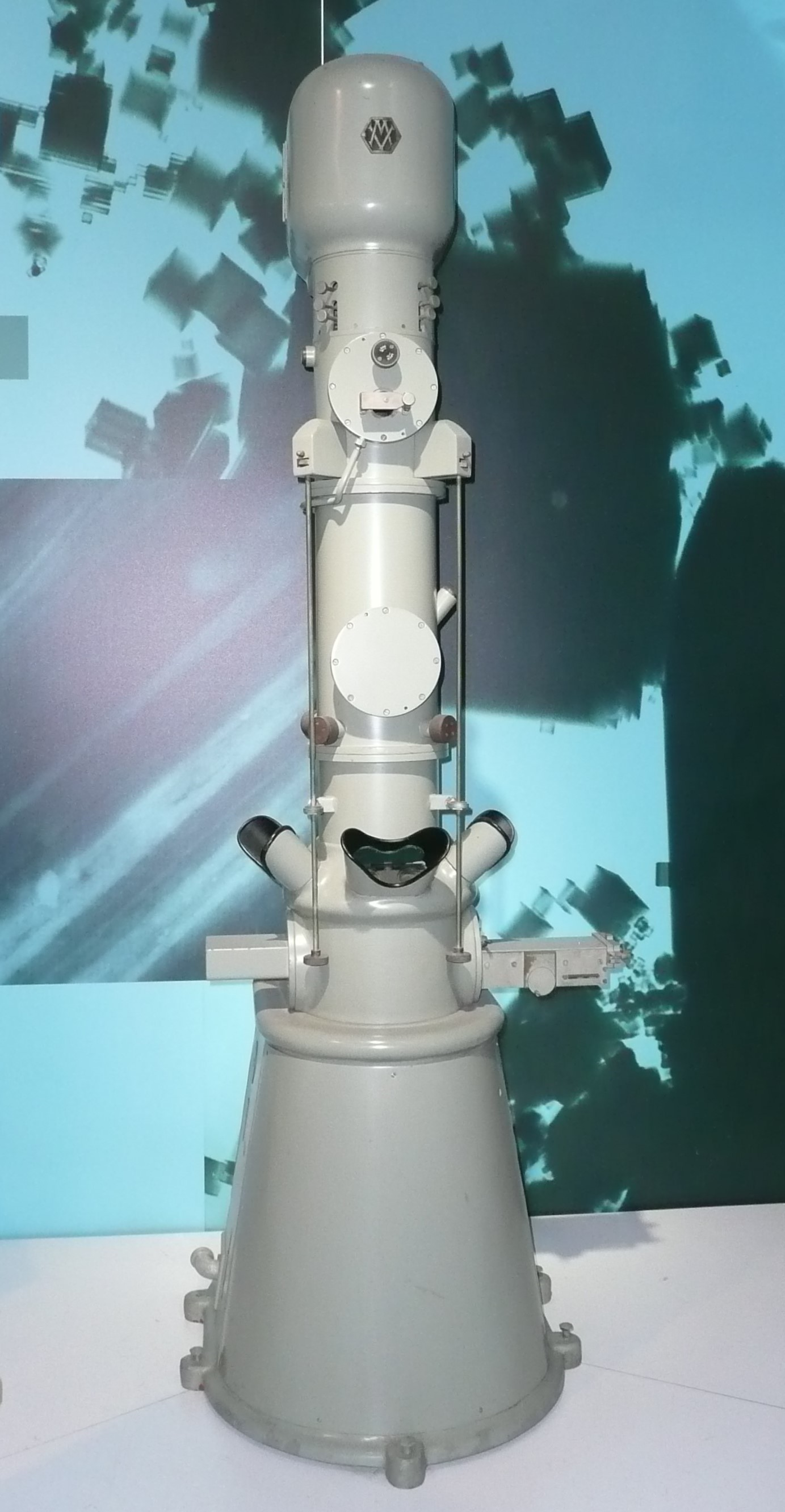
Metropolitan-Vickers electron microscope

The post-war era led to massive demand for electrical systems, leading to additional rivalries between Metrovick and BTH as each attempted to one-up the other in delivering ever-larger turbogenerator contracts. Metrovick also expanded its appliance division during this time, becoming a well known supplier of refrigerators and stoves.

The design and manufacture of sophisticated scientific instruments, such as electron microscopes, and mass spectrometers, became an important area of scientific research for the company.

In 1947, a Metrovick G.1 Gatric gas turbine was fitted to the Motor Gun Boat MGB 2009, making it the world's first gas turbine powered naval vessel. A subsequent marine gas turbine engine was the G.2 of 4,500 shp fitted to the Royal Navy Bold-class fast patrol boats Bold Pioneer and Bold Pathfinder, which were built in 1953.

The Bluebird K7 jet-propelled 3-point hydroplane in which Donald Campbell broke the 200 mph water speed barrier was powered with a Metropolitan-Vickers Beryl jet engine producing 3,500 lbf (16 kN) of thrust. The K7 was unveiled in late 1954. Campbell succeeded on Ullswater on 23 July 1955, where he set a record of 202.15 mph (325.33 km/h), beating the previous record by some 24 mph (39 km/h) held by Stanley Sayres.

Another major area of expansion was in the diesel locomotive market, where they combined their own generators and traction motors with third-party diesel engines to develop in 1950 the Western Australian Government Railways X class 2-Do-2 locomotive and in 1958 the type 2 Co-Bo, later re-classified under the TOPS system as the British Rail Class 28. This diesel-electric locomotive was unusual on two counts; its Co-Bo wheel arrangement and its Crossley 2-Stroke diesel engine (evolved from a World War II marine engine). Intended as part the British Railways Modernisation Plan, the twenty-strong fleet saw service between Scotland and England before being deemed unsuccessful and withdrawn in the late 1960s. Metrovick also produced the CIÉ 001 Class (originally 'A' Class) from 1955, the first production mainline diesels in Ireland.

Metropolitan Vickers also produced electrical equipment for the British Rail Class 76 (EM1), and British Rail Class 77 (EM2), 1.5 kV DC locomotives, built at Gorton Works for the electrification of the Woodhead Line in the early 1950s. Larger but broadly similar locomotives were also supplied to the New South Wales Government Railways as its 46 class. The company also designed the British Rail Class 82, 25 kV AC locomotives built by Beyer, Peacock & Company in Manchester using Metrovick electrical equipment. The company also supplied electrical equipment for the British Rail Class 303 electric multiple units.

In the 1950s, the company built a large power transformer works at Wythenshawe, Manchester. The factory opened in 1957, and was closed by GEC in 1971, after which it was sold to the American compressor manufacturer Ingersoll Rand.

In 1961, the Russian cosmonaut Yuri Gagarin was invited to the company's factory at Trafford Park as part of his tour of Manchester.

The rivalry between Metrovick and BTH was eventually ended in an unconvincing fashion when the AEI management eventually decided to rid themselves of both brands and be known as AEI universally, a change they made on 1 January 1960. This move was almost universally resented within both companies. Worse, the new brand name was utterly unknown to its customers, leading to a noticeable fall-off in sales and AEI's stock price.

=== General Electric Company (GEC) takeover ===
When AEI attempted to remove the doubled-up management structures, they found this task to be even more difficult. By the mid-1960s the company was struggling under the weight of two complete management hierarchies, and they appeared to be unable to control the company any more. This allowed AEI to be purchased by General Electric Company in 1967.

== See also ==
- Category:Metropolitan-Vickers locomotives
- Bowesfield Works
- Metro-Vickers Affair
- Metrovick electric vehicles

== Bibliography ==
- Scott, J. D. (1963). Vickers: A History. London: Weidenfeld & Nicolson.
- Gillham, John C. (1988). The Age of the Electric Train: Electric Trains in Britain since 1883. London: Ian Allan Ltd. ISBN 0-7110-1392-6.
