= List of Chemins de fer de l'Est locomotives =

The Chemins de fer de l'Est was one of the five main constituents of the SNCF at its creation in 1938.

Est No.	Power class (Série)	SNCF No.	Type	Manufacturer	Year made	Quantity made	Year(s) withdrawn	Comments
1–25	1	—	1A1 n2	Société Expansion	1847	25	by 1907	Most rebuilt as 1B n2
26–40	1	—	1A1 n2	Cave	1847	15	by 1907	Most rebuilt as 1B n2
41–50	1	—	1A1 n2	Cave	1848–49	10	by 1884	
51–53	1	—	1A1 n2	Motteau	1846	3	by 1884	
54–78	1	—	1A1 n2	Société Ch.Derosne et Cail	1847	25	by 1907	Most rebuilt as 1B n2
79–90	?	—	2A n2	Société J. F. Cail & Cie.	1852	12	1913	Crampton locomotives. 80 Le Continent preserved at Cité du train.
91–100	2	—	1B n2	Schneider et Cie	1853	10	by 1914	
101–135	3	—	B1 n2	Société J. F. Cail & Cie.	1853–54	35	by 1930	
136–141	?	—	1A1 n2	Charbonnier & Cie.	1854	6	1884	Ex Saint-Dizier–Gray 1–6
142–143	?	—	B1 n2	Société J. F. Cail & Cie.	1854	2	by 1900	Ex Saint-Dizier–Gray 7–8
144–157	3	—	B1 n2	Société J. F. Cail & Cie.	1855	14	by 1933	
158–173	—	—	1A1 n2	Charbonnier & Cie.	1854	16	by 1890	
174–188	?	—	2A n2	Schneider et Cie	1856	15	by 1913	Crampton locomotives
189–222	3	—	1B n2	André Koechlin (10); Ernest Goüin et Cie (24)	1855–57	34	by 1910	21 rebuilt as 1B1, 1888–91; rebuilds withdrawn 1929–30
223–228	3	—	1B n2	Mulhouse Works	1853	6	1869–80	ex Strasbourg–Bale 0.1 to 0.6
229–242	3	—	1B n2	Mulhouse Works	1858	14	1875–84	ordered by Strasbourg–Bale as 0.7 to 0.20 (continuation of 0.1 to 0.6 series) delivered to Est
243–258	3	—	1B n2	Ernest Gouin et Cie	1856–57	16	by 1910	254 Sold to contractors in 1857 and replaced.
259	?	—	1B n2	Stehelin & Huber	1839	1	1855	ex Strasbourg–Bâle, exx Mulhouse–Thann no. IV
260–261	?	—	1A1 n2	Stehelin & Huber	1839	2	1855–58	ex Strasbourg–Bâle 8 and 9, 1849 rebuilt as 1Bn2
262–263	?	—	1A1 n2	J. J. Meyer	1842	2	1859	ex Strasbourg–Bâle 24 and 25
264–265	?	—	1A1 n2	André Koechlin	1839–40	2	1856–68	ex Strasbourg–Bâle, exx Mulhouse–Thann I and II
266–268	?	—	1A1 n2	Sharp, Roberts & Company	1838	3	1855–61	ex Strasbourg–Bâle 2, 1, and 3
269–286	?	—	1A1 n2	André Koechlin	1840–41	18	1858–72	ex Strasbourg–Bâle 4–7, 10–23
287	?	—	1A1 n2	Schneider et Cie	1839	1	1861	ex Strasbourg–Bâle, exx Mulhouse–Thann III
259–260	3	—	B1 n2	Société J. F. Cail & Cie.	1857	2	by 1907	ex Parent & Schaken, contractors. Acquired 1861
261–285	3	—	1B n2t	Graffenstaden (8); André Koechlin (8); Épernay Works (9)	1869–79	25	1908–30	
288–299	?	—	1A1 n2	Alfred Hallette et Cie	1846–47	12	by 1883	ex Montereau–Troyes 1, 3–5, 7, 9–10, 12–16
300–303	?	—	1B n2	Alfred Hallette et Cie	1846–47	4	by 1880	ex Montereau–Troyes 2, 6, 8, 11
304–361	2	—	1B n2	Épernay Works (20); Graffenstaden (38)	1858–63	58	1910–26	
362–420	?	—	1B n2	Schneider et Cie	1857–62	59	1891–1910	ex Ardennes 1–59; four rebuilt as 2-4-2
421–440	3	—	1B n2	Graffenstaden (10); Schneider (10)	1869	20	1910–20	
441–485	3	1-021.A.446 – 478	B1 n2	SACM-G (25); SACM-B (20)	1885	45	1926–45	later Série 4
501–510	3	—	1B n2	Épernay Works	1878–79	10	1907–13	Two rebuilt as 4-4-0
508-509	?	—	2′B n2	Épernay Works	1892	2	1924–25	rebuilt from 2-4-0s (same number)
511–562	3	—	1B n2	Société J. F. Cail & Cie. (12); Wiener Neustadt (20); Épernay Works (20)	1882–86	52	19	
601–612	?	—	2A n2	Société J. F. Cail & Cie.	1857	12	1900–13	Crampton locomotives, ex PLM, acquired 1869
613–742	8	1-031.TA.638 – 741	C1 n2t	Épernay Works (55); SACM-G (41); Cail (10); Batignolles (14)	1881–95	130	1924–?	50 rebuilt as 4-6-0T (1899) and renumbered B 684 … B 733; 45 rebuilt as 2-6-2T (1904–11) and renumbered V 613 … V 666
751	8	—	1C n2t	Borsig	1898	1	1931	Prussian T9.2 received as war reparations
801–840	9	—	2′B n2	Épernay Works	1891–95	40	1904–22	“Camels”
1000–1001	8	—	C n2	Graffenstaden	1867	2	1892–93	Power tenders removed in 1873 and rebuilt as 0-6-0T in 1886
1002–1003	9	1-030.A.2	C n2v	Épernay Works	1893	2	1937–38	
1004–1005	9	1-030.A.3 – 4	C n2	Épernay Works	1893	2	1940–45	
0.1 – 0.10	5	—	C n2	Société Expansion	1848	10	1891–99	
0.11 – 0.32	5	—	C n2	Société J. F. Cail & Cie. (10); André Koechlin (12)	1850–52	22	by 1926	
0.33 – 0.50	6	—	C n2	André Koechlin	1852–53	18	by 1928	
0.51 – 0.62	6	—	C n2	André Koechlin	1853	12	by 1926	
0.63 – 0.107	6	—	C n2	Société J. F. Cail & Cie.	1853–54	45	by 1927	
0.108 – 0.113	?	—	C n2t	André Koechlin	1854	6	1880–84	0.109 to PO in 1854, replaced by new 0.109 in 1855; old 0.109 returned and renumbered 0.211 in 1858. Renumbered 0.165 – 0.170 in 1880–84.
0.114 – 0.119	6	—	C n2	Société J. F. Cail & Cie.	1854	6	by 1927	Mammouth
0.120 – 0.135	7	—	C n2	André Koechlin	1855–56	16	1891–1925	Bourbonnais 0.120 renumbered 0.164 (1861) new Est No. 0.121 - 0.135 (1861)
0.136 – 0.163	7	—	C n2	André Koechlin	1856	28	by 1924	Bourbonnais
0.164 – 0.188	?	—	D2′ n2t	Schneider et Cie	1856–57	25	1859–68	Engerth locomotives; rebuilt as 0-8-0 and renumbered 0.501 – 0.525 (1859–68)
0.189 – 0.200	7	—	C n2	Épernay Works	1857	12	by 1928	Mammouth
0.201 – 0.210	?	1-030.TB.203	C n2t	Mulhouse Works	1858	10	by 1944	based on PO 1001-series design, 4 rebuilt as tram (Gargan to Livry) Est 0.203, 0.206, 0.208 and 0.209
0.211	?	—	C n2t	André Koechlin	1854	1	1883	ex 0.109, retired 1858
0.212 – 0.241	7	—	C n2	André Koechlin	1858	30	by 1924	Bourbonnais Identical to 0.121 – 0.164
0.242 – 0.249	?	—	C n2t	André Koechlin	1859	8	19by 1933	
0.250 – 0.277	8	—	C n2	Schneider et Cie	1859–61	28	1920–37	12 rebuilt as 2-6-0 and renumbered 30252–30275 (1908–27)
0.278 – 0.284	6	—	C n2	Société J. F. Cail & Cie.	1851–56	7	by 1926	Acquired 1860–61 from CF Lyon à Mediterreanée and their Contractor, Parent et Schaken
0.171 – 0.182	6	—	C n2t	Graffenstaden	1866	12	by 1920	
0.183 – 0.184	?	—	C n2t	SACM-M	1879	2	1906	Ex Moselotte, acquired 1880
0.165 – 0.166	?	—	C n2t	Épernay Works	1886	2	by 1928	Rebuilt from 1001–1002's steam tenders
0.278 – 0.299	8	—	C n2	Épernay Works	1864–67	22	1920–37	11 rebuilt as 2-6-0 and renumbered 30279–30298 (1905–1925)
0.300 – 0.349	8	—	C n2	Schneider et Cie	1858–62	50	1920–37	ex Ardennes 0.1 – 0.50, acquired 1863; 31 rebuilt as 2-6-0 and renumbered 30302–30349 (1908–26)
0.350 – 0.478	8	—	C n2	Épernay Works (109); André Koechlin (20)	1866–84	129	1920–37	72 rebuilt as 2-6-0 and renumbered 30352–30478 (1908–26)
0.479 – 0.500	8	—	C n2	Schneider et Cie	1881	22	1930–37	2 rebuilt as 2-6-0 and renumbered 30480 and 30489 (1925)
0.501 – 0.525	9	1-040.A.509 – 520	D n2		1859–68	25	1920–?	rebuilt from 0-8-4T Engerth locomotives
0.526 – 0.691	9	1-040.A.534 – 691	D n2	Graffenstaden (16); Fives-Lille (16); Épernay Works (6); SACM (44); Schneider et Cie (59); Cail (25)	1866–88	166	by 1959	
0.701 – 0.766	8	—	C n2	Schneider et Cie (33); Épernay Works (3); SACM-M (30)	1881–84	66	1930–37	12 rebuilt as 2-6-0 and renumbered 30701–30766 (1914–25)
0.901 – 0.948	7	—	C n2t	SACM-M	1880–84	48	by 1937	PO 1031-series design
2401–2408	8	1-220.A.405 – 408	2′B n4v	Épernay Works	1900	8	1937–50	
2409–2432	8	1-220.A.410 – 432	2′B n4v	Épernay Works (14); SACM (10)	1899–1900	24	1924–50	
2511–2561	4	—	1B n2	Épernay Works	1904–12	51	1923–38	Rebuilt from 511–561
2601–2602	8	1-221.A.601 – 602	2′B1 n4v	SACM-B	1902	2	1939–45	Copies of Nord 2.643 series
2701–2705	?	—	2′B1 n4v	SACM-G (5)	1904–05	(5)	by 1933	Ex de Glehn-type Prussian S 7; received as war reparations in 1919
2706–2710	?	—	2′B1 n4v	Linke-Hofmann (1); Hanomag (4)	1904–06	(5)	by 1933	Ex von Borries-type Prussian S 7; received as war reparations in 1919
2901–2904	?	—	2′B1 n4v	Hanomag	1909	(4)	by 1933	Ex Prussian S 9; received as war reparations in 1919
3001–3015	10	1-030.B.1 – 14	C n2	Épernay Works	1896–97	15	by 1952	Development of 1004–1005
3101–3102	11	—	2′C n4v	Épernay Works	1903	2	1933	Prototypes
3103–3146	11	1-230.J/K.103 – 146	2′C n4v	Épernay Works	1906–08	44	by 1965	Rebuilt with superheaters (1912–14); rebuilt with feedwater heaters (SNCF ‘K’) and renumbered 230.103–230.146 (1932–46)
3147–3280	11S	1-230.J/K.147 – 280	2′C h4v	Épernay Works (44); Maffei (20); SACM-B (20); Batignolles-Châtillon (50)	1908–27	134	19	Rebuilt with feedwater heaters (SNCF ‘K’) and renumbered 230.147–230.280 (1932–46)
3301	?	—	2′C n4v	Sächsische Maschinenfabrik	1913	(1)	1933	Ex Saxon XII HV; received as war reparations in 1919
3305–3307	?	1-230.E.305 – 306	2′C h2	Sächsische Maschinenfabrik	1909	(3)	1930–?	Ex Saxon XII H1; received as war reparations in 1919
3311–3335	11S	1-230.F.311 – 335	2′C h2	BMAG (10); Borsig (2); Linke-Hofmann (5); Henschel & Sohn (8)	1909–18	(25)	?	Ex Prussian P 8; received as war reparations in 1919
3351–3367	11/11S	—	2′C n4v	Maffei	1903–09	(17)	by 1925	Ex Bavarian S 3/5; received as war reparations in 1919
3401–3500	11/11S	1-230.A.401 – 500	2′C n4v	Épernay Works	1897–1902	100	by 1955	
3501–3890	11/11S	1-230.B.501 – 890	2′C n4v	Maffei (20); Schneider et Cie (105); Épernay Works (60); SACM-B (35); Société Franco-Belge-R (50); Henschel & Sohn (30); Sächsische Maschinenfabrik (30); Batignolles (20); Fives-Lille (20); ANF (20)	1901–12	390	by 1967	Last 100 built with superheaters
3901–3940	11	1-232.TA.901 – 940	2′C2′ n4vt	SACM-B (20); Sächsische Maschinenfabrik (20)	1905–1910	40	19	Renumbered 33901–33940 in 1913
4001–4002	12	—	1′D n4v	SACM-B	1902	2	1924–34	Prototypes, based on Midi 4001
4003–4175	12/12S	1-140.A.3–175	1′D n4vt	Épernay Works (88); Henschel & Sohn (20); Sächsische Maschinenfabrik (20); Fives-Lille (30); ANF (15)	1905–14	173	by 1954	Last 105 built with superheaters
4240–4291	12S	1-040.D.440 – 491	D h2	(various)	1915–19	(52)	by 1956	Ex Prussian G 8.1; received as war reparations by PO and numbered 1304–70/80–84; 52 to Est and 20 to PLM in 1924.
4292–4399	12S	1-040.D.442–4399	D h2	(various)	1913–18	(108)	by 1966	Ex Prussian G 8.1; received as war reparations
4401–4402	11S	1-141.TB.401 – 402	1′D1′ h2t	Épernay Works	1911	2	19	Prototypes
4403–4512	11S	1-141.TB.403 – 512	1′D1′ h2t	Épernay Works (50); ANF (15); Société de Saint-Léonard (15); SFCM (30)	1913–17	110	by 1972	
4651	11S	1-141.TA.651	1′D1′ h3t	Henschel & Sohn	1912	1	1939	Ex Prussian T 14 prototype; received as war reparations
4656–4682	11S	1-141.TA.656 – 682	1′D1′ h2t	(various)	1914–18	(27)	1951–57	Ex Prussian T 14; received as war reparations
4700–4702	10	—	D n2	Sharp, Stewart & Company	1887–88	(3)	by 1925	Ordered by Swedish & Norwegian Railway; ten acquired by Baden State Railway in 1893 and classified Baden VIII b. Received by Est as war reparations
4704	10b	—	D n2v	Hanomag	1895	1	1931	Ex Prussian G 7.2; received as war reparations
4706–4745	10b	1-040.B.706 – 745	D n2	(various)	1898–1916	40	by 1954	Ex Prussian G 7.1; received as war reparations
4751–4758	9	—	B′B n4v	MBG Karlsruhe (2); Maschinenfabrik Esslingen (6)	1895–1900	8	by 1936	Ex Baden VIII c; received as war reparations
4761–4764	9	—	B′B n4v	Sächsische Maschinenfabrik	1898–99	4	by 1936	Ex Saxon I V; received as war reparations
4801–4831	11S	1-040.C.801 – 831	D h2	(various)	1906–13	31	19	Ex Prussian G 8; received as war reparations
4901–4990	9	1-040.TA.901 – 990	D n2t	SFCM (60); Épernay Works (10); ANF (20)	1907–12	90	1956–61	Station shunters; Nord 4.446 design
5001–5002	13	1-151.TA.701 – 702	1′E1′ h2t	Épernay Works	1913	2	1959–63	Renumbered 151.701 and 151.702 in 1930
5005	12	1-050.A.5	E n2v	Maschinenfabrik Esslingen	1905	(1)	1939	Württemberg H; received as war reparations
5006–5007	12S	1-050.A.6 – 7	E h2	Maschinenfabrik Esslingen	1909	(2)	1939–50	Württemberg Hh; received as war reparations
5008–5010	12S	1-050.A.8 – 9	E h2	Maschinenfabrik Esslingen	1913	(3)	1936–50	Württemberg Hh
5015	13	1-150.A.15	1′E h3	Henschel & Sohn	1917	(1)	1945	Ex Prussian G 12 (CFOA type).
5101–5105	13	1-150.B.546 – 550	1′E h3	Henschel & Sohn	1916–17	5	1925	Ex Prussian G 12.1; received as war reparations; sold to Alsace-Lorraine 5546–5550 in 1925; scrapped 1951–55
5151–5159	13	1-150.C.681 – 689	1′E h3	Henschel & Sohn (7); Borsig (2)	1918	9	1919	Ex Prussian G 12; received as war reparations; sold to Alsace-Lorraine 5681–5689 in 1919; scrapped 1951–57
5201–5206	13	1-150.D.201 –206	1′E h3	Sächsische Maschinenfabrik	1917	6	by 1953	Ex Saxon XIII H
5211–5335	13	1-150.E.1 – 125	1′E h3	SACM-G (45); SACM-? (7); Fives-Lille (57); ANF (16)	1926–29	125	1957–60	Development of Saxon XIII H Renumbered 150.001 to 150.125
5901–5925	13	151.TA-.703 – 727	1′E1′ h2t	Schneider et Cie	1925–26	25	1957–65	
6001–6002	13	—	(1′C)C n4v	American Locomotive Company-S	1908	2	1924–31	Mallet
6101–6113	13	—	(B1′)(1′B) n4vt	Épernay Works	1911	13	1921	Kitson-Meyer/du Bousquet locomotives; sold to the Ceinture in 1921; resold to the Nord in 1934
30252…30428	8C	1-130.A.252 … 428	1′C n2v	Épernay Works	1905–09	48	by 1957	Rebuilds of 0-6-0 locomotives
30254…30766	8S	1-130.B.243 … 766	1′C h2	Épernay Works	1910–26	92	by 1968	Rebuilds of 0-6-0 locomotives
31001–31040	11S	1-231.B.1 – 20	2′C1′ h4v	Société Franco-Belge-R (20); Batignolles-Châtillon (20)	1921–23	40	1957–59	État-type Pacific; renumbered 231.001–231.040
32001–32050	11S bis	1-131.TB.1 – 50	1′C1′ h2t	ANF (25); Fives-Lille (25)	1925	50	1955–68	
40001–40035	12S	1-140.C1 – 35	1′D h2	North British Locomotive Company	1916	35	1960–73	Ex ALVF, acquired 1918
40101–40310	12S	1-140-B101 – 310; 140.G.891 … 1100	1′D h2	Baldwin Locomotive Works	1917–18	210	?	Pershing 2-8-0 locomotives
41001	13	1-241.A.1	2′D1′ h4v	Épernay Works	1925	1	1959	renumbered 241.001
141.701 – 141.702	12S	1-141.TC.701 – 702	1′D1′ h3t	Épernay Works	1930	2	1959	Prototypes
141.703 – 141.742	12S	1-141.TC.703 – 742	1′D1′ h3t	SFCM	1932–33	40	1954–67	Suburban tank locomotives; Seven to Ouest region as 3-141.TD in 1955
150.126 – 150.195	13	1-150.E.126 – 195	1′E h3	Fives-Lille (50); SACM-G (20)	1970	70	1957–63	Continuation of 5211–5335
151.751 – 151.780	13	1-151.TC.751 – 780	1′E1′ h3t	SACM-G	1931–32	30	1959–67	
231.051 – 231.073	12S	1-231.C.51–73	2′C1′ h4v	Fives-Lille; SACM; SFCM	1910–14	23	1957	Ex PO Pacifics, ordered in 1934 and rebuilt 1935
241.002 – 241.041	13	1-241.A.2 – 41	2′D1′ h4v	Fives-Lille (20); SFCM (20)	1931–32	40	19	
241.108 … 241.137	13	1-241.A.42 – 51	2′D1′ h4v	Fives-Lille (6); SFCM (4)	1931–32	10		Ex État 241.001 – 241.049 class (same design as Est 241.001 to 241.041); transferred 1938; remainder of class transferred to Est region 1945–48.
5002…5365		1-040.D.2 … 280	D h2	(various)	1913–19	(39)		ex Prussian G 8.1s of Alsace-Lorraine, acquired 1935
5701…5811	12S	1-140.B.701 … 811	1′D n2	Baldwin Locomotive Works	1917–19	(29)		ex Pershing 2-8-0 locomotives of the Alsace-Lorraine, acquired 1937

== Preserved locomotives ==
Image	Est No.	No. series	Power class (Série)	SNCF No.	UIC Type	Manufacturer	Serial No.	Date	Comments
	80 Le Continent	79–90	?	—	2A n2	J. F. Cail	189	1852	Static display, Cité du train, Mulhouse.
	291	288–299	?	—	1A1	Alfred Hallette et Cie	5	1847	Ex CF Montereau–Troyes No. 5 Sézanne; static display, Cité du train, Mulhouse.
	32031	32001–32050	11S bis	1-131.TB.31	1′C1′ h2t	Fives-Lille		1925	Cité du train, Mulhouse, (not exposed).
	4407	4403–4512	11S	1-141.TB.407	1′D1′ h2t	ANF	25	1913	Restored by AJECTA, Longville. Monument Historique PM77000978
	4424	4403–4512	11S	1-141.TB.424	1′D1′ h2t	Société de Saint-Léonard	1768	1913	Restored by AAATV; on loan to La Vapeur du Trieux. Monument Historique PM68000588
	30348	30252–30766	8S	1-130.B.348	1′C h2	Épernay Works	T 137	1925	AJECTA, Longville.
	30439	30252–30766	8S	1-130.B.439	1′C h2	Épernay Works	T 81	1914	
	30476	30252–30766	8S	1-130.B.476	1′C h2	Épernay Works	T 112	1922	AJECTA, Longville.
	40022	40001–40035	12S	1-140.C.22	1′D n2	North British Locomotive Co.	21544	1916	Ex ALVF 22
	40027	40001–40035	12S	1-140.C.27	1′D n2	North British Locomotive Co.	21549	1916	Ex ALVF 27; Monument Historique PM30000546
	41000; 241.001	41000	13	1-241.A.1	2′D1′ h4v	Épernay Works	904	1925	First 4-8-2 in Europe. Static display, Cité du train, Mulhouse
	141.170	141.701 – 141.742	12S	1-141.TC.740; 3-141.TD.740	1′D1′ h3t	SFCM	4221	1932	Monument Historique PM24000509
