= Est 0.189 to 0.200 =

Type and origin
- Power type: Steam
- Build date: 1857
Specifications
- Configuration
  - Whyte: 0-6-0
  - UIC: C n2
- Gauge: 1,435 mm (4 ft 8 1/2 in)
- Driver dia.: 1.34 m (4 ft 4 3/4 in)
- Wheelbase: 3.40 m (11 ft 1 3/4 in)
- Length: 7.69 m (25 ft 3 in)
- Loco weight: 27.9–28.5 t (61,500–62,800 lb)
- Fuel type: Coal
- Firebox
  - Type: Crampton
  - Grate area: 1.15 m^{2} (12.4 sq ft)
- Boiler pressure: 8–9 kg/cm^{2} (0.785–0.883 MPa; 114–128 psi)
- Heating surface: 98 m^{2} (1,050 sq ft)
- Cylinders: Two, inside
- Cylinder size: 420 mm × 610 mm (16 9/16 in × 24 in)
- Valve gear: Stephenson
Career
- Operators: Chemins de fer de l'Est
- Numbers: Est: 0.189 – 0.200
- Nicknames: Mammouth

Est 0.189 to 0.200 were 0-6-0 locomotives for freight traffic of the Chemins de fer de l'Est. They were put in service in 1857 and were retired until 1928.

== Construction history ==
The machines were of similar design as the Est 0.33–0.120 and were built in the workshops of the Chemins de fer de l'Est at Épernay in 1855–1856. They mainly differed in the wheel diameter, which was reduced to 1.34 m (4 ft 4 3/4 in). The locomotives had a Crampton firebox and boiler with a boiler pressure of 8 kg/cm^{2} (0.785 MPa; 114 psi). Beginning with August 1881 the machines received a new boiler with an increased pressure of 9 kg/cm^{2} (0.883 MPa; 128 psi), tractive effort increased from 3,861 kg (8,510 lb) to 4,698 kg (10,400 lb), while the weight increased from 27.9 t (61,500 lb) to 28.5 t (62,800 lb).

The machines were coupled with two-axle tenders, containing 6 m^{3} (212 cu ft) of water and 2.5 t (5,510 lb) of coal, and weighing 22 t (48,500 lb).

The locomotives were given the following names:

- 0.189: Villette
- 0.190: Voulzie
- 0.191: Armance
- 0.192: Mortagne
- 0.193: Superbe
- 0.194: Luzine
- 0.195: Furieuse
- 0.196: Vallière
- 0.197: Cuisance
- 0.198: Savoureuse
- 0.199: Orne
- 0.200: Ognon

== Service history ==
The locomotives were used for freight trains, similar to the Est 0.63–0.120 for mixed service. In 1875 the machines were listed at the depots Châlons, Bar-le-Duc, Troyes, Chaumont, Nancy, Epinal, Vesoul and Belfort and were used to run freight trains from Paris to Nancy and to Belfort, from Nancy to Belfort and on branch lines. Later the machines were used on secondary lines and shunting. The last locomotive in service, the Est 0.198, was removed from service in 1928.
