= Est 0.1 to 0.120 =

Class of French 0-6-0 locomotives

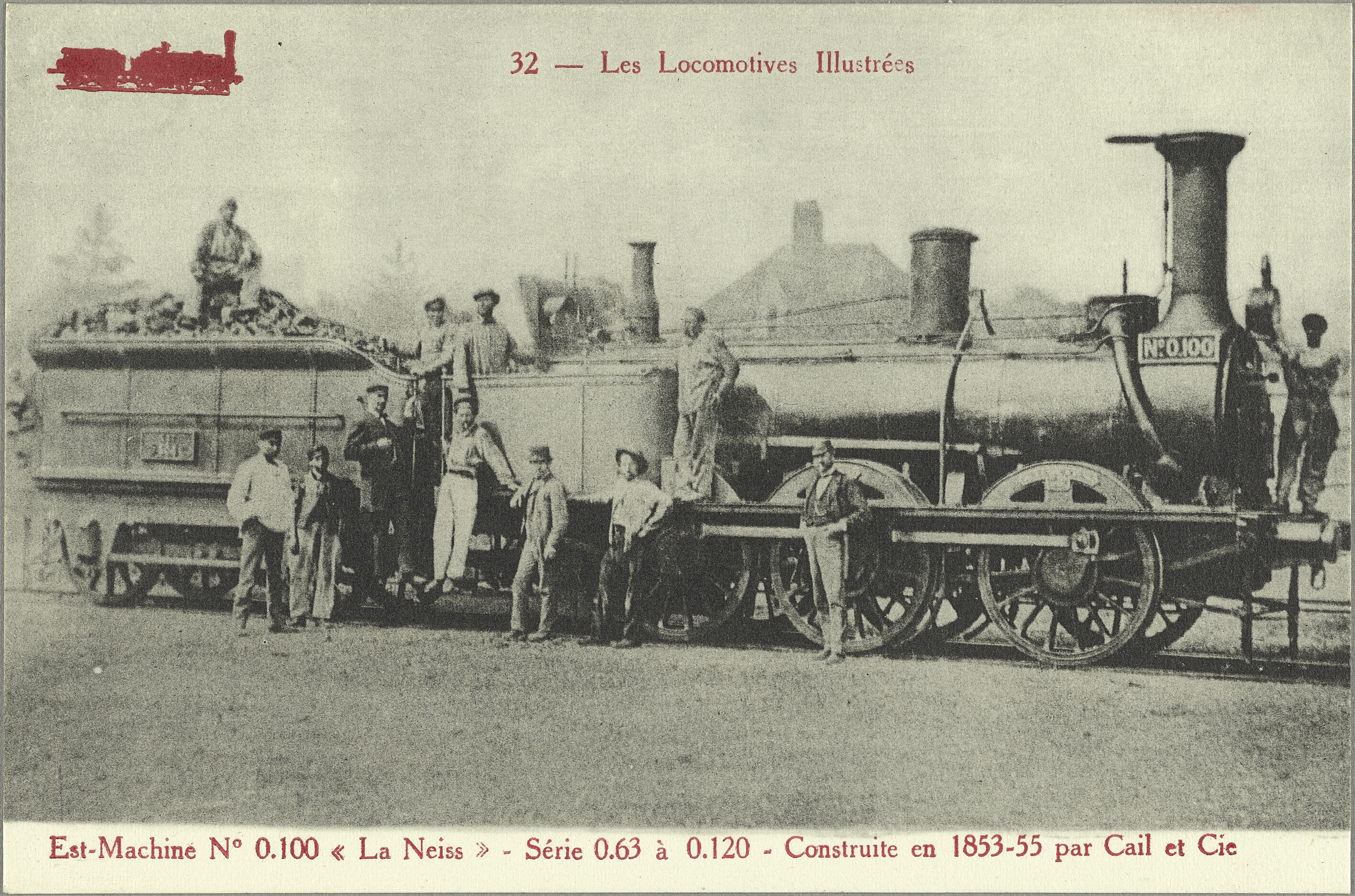
- Nr. 0.100 ′La Neiss′
Type and origin
- Power type: Steam
- Build date: 1848–1860
Specifications
- Configuration
  - Whyte: 0-6-0
  - UIC: C n2
- Gauge: 1,435 mm (4 ft 8 1/2 in)
- Driver dia.: 1.43–1.46 m (4 ft 8 1/4 in – 4 ft 9 1/2 in)
- Wheelbase: 3.40 m (11 ft 1 3/4 in)
- Length: 7.68 m (25 ft 2 in)
- Loco weight: 29–30.5 t (63,900–67,200 lb)
- Fuel type: Coal
- Firebox
  - Type: Crampton
  - Grate area: 1.15 m^{2} (12.4 sq ft)
- Boiler pressure: 8–9 kg/cm^{2} (0.785–0.883 MPa; 114–128 psi)
- Heating surface: 98 m^{2} (1,050 sq ft)
- Cylinders: Two, inside
- Cylinder size: 380 mm–420 mm × 600 mm or 610 mm (14 15/16 in–16 9/16 in × 23 5/8 in or 24 in)
- Valve gear: Stephenson
Performance figures
- Maximum speed: 60 km/h (37 mph)
Career
- Operators: Chemins de fer de l'Est
- Numbers: Est: 0.1 – 0.120
- Nicknames: Mammouth

Est 0.1 to 0.120 were 0-6-0 locomotives for mixed traffic of the Chemins de fer de l'Est. They were retired from service from 1891 until 1928.

== Construction history ==
The first series, Est 0.1–0.10, was built in 1848 by the Société l'Expansion à Mulhouse, following the design of the Stephenson 0-6-0 Mammouth locomotives. The locomotives had a Crampton firebox and boiler with a boiler pressure of 8 kg/cm^{2} (0.785 MPa; 114 psi). The regulator was placed on the first boiler shell. The cylinders, 380 mm × 600 mm (14 15/16 in × 23 5/8 in), were inside of the frame in an inclined position, with a Stephenson valve gear.

The second series, Est 0.11–0.32, had only little differences and was put into service in 1850–1851. It was followed by the series Est 0.33–0.62, which received a bigger boiler and had an increased cylinder size of 420 mm × 600 mm (16 9/16 in × 23 5/8 in). The weight increased by about 1.1–1.2 t (2,430–2,650 lb). The series Est 0.63–0.107 and 0.114–0.119 were built in 1853–1855 by Société J. F. Cail & Cie, and the series 0.108–0.112 as well as the 0.113 and the 0.120 were acquired from Parent & Schaken in 1860.

Beginning with May 1881 many of the machines received a new boiler with 9 kg/cm^{2} (0.883 MPa; 128 psi) at their overhaul.

Table of orders and numbers
Year	Quantity	Est Nos.	Manufacturer	Serial Nos.	Notes
1848	10	0.1 – 0.10	Expansion	104–113	
1850–51	10	0.11–0.20	Société J. F. Cail & Cie	165–174	
1851–52	12	0.21–0.32	André Koechlin et Cie	112–123	
1852–53	30	0.33–0.62	André Koechlin et Cie	124–153	
1853–54	45	0.63–0.107	Société J. F. Cail & Cie	264–308	
1854	6	0.114–0.119	Société J. F. Cail & Cie	357–362	

The locomotives were given the following names:

- 0.1: Seine
- 0.2: Ourcq
- 0.3: Marne
- 0.4: Ornain
- 0.5: Meuse
- 0.6: Moselle
- 0.7: Meurthe
- 0.8: Seille
- 0.9: Sarre
- 0.10: Rhin
- 0.11: Industrie
- 0.12: Commerce
- 0.13: Maréchal Lannes
- 0.14: Foulton
- 0.15: Papin
- 0.16: Salamandre
- 0.17: Etna
- 0.18: Vésuve
- 0.19: Vulcain
- 0.20: Eclair
- 0.21: Sirocco
- 0.22: Hercule
- 0.23: Abondance
- 0.24: Alerte
- 0.25: Atelier
- 0.26: Stephenson
- 0.27: Champagne
- 0.28: Lorraine
- 0.29: Alsace
- 0.30: Prusse
- 0.31: Bavière
- 0.32: Suisse
- 0.33: Bélier
- 0.34: Taureau
- 0.35: Gèmeaux
- 0.36: Ecrevisse
- 0.37: Lion
- 0.38: Vierge
- 0.39: Balance
- 0.40: Scorpion
- 0.41: Sagittaire
- 0.42: Capricorne
- 0.43: Allemagne
- 0.44: Germanie
- 0.45: Autriche
- 0.46: Hongrie
- 0.47: Saxe
- 0.48: Bohème
- 0.49: Souabe
- 0.50: Moravie
- 0.51: Westphalie
- 0.52: Silésie
- 0.53: Illyrie
- 0.54: Franconie
- 0.55: Styrie
- 0.56: Galicie
- 0.57: Dalmatie
- 0.58: Carinthie
- 0.59: Croatie
- 0.60: Esclavonie
- 0.61: Transylvanie
- 0.62: Vandalie
- 0.63: Bas-Rhin
- 0.64: Haut-Rhin
- 0.65: Pologne
- 0.66: Lithuanie
- 0.67: Poméranie
- 0.68: Wurthemberg
- 0.69: Duché de Bade
- 0.70: Holstein
- 0.71: Lusace
- 0.72: Misnie
- 0.73: Hesse
- 0.74: Reuss
- 0.75: Carniole
- 0.76: Danube
- 0.77: Inn
- 0.78: Weser
- 0.79: Elbe
- 0.80: Oder
- 0.81: Vistule
- 0.82: Niémen
- 0.83: Baltique
- 0.84: Dnieper
- 0.85: Fulde
- 0.86: Leck
- 0.87: Neckar
- 0.88: Mein
- 0.89: Tauber
- 0.90: Saale
- 0.91: Redwitz
- 0.92: Detme
- 0.93: Warnow
- 0.94: Trave
- 0.95: Illemnau
- 0.96: Aller
- 0.97: Leine
- 0.98: Usbach
- 0.99: Sprée
- 0.100: Neiss
- 0.101: Orsa
- 0.102: Werra
- 0.103: Letz
- 0.104: Mung
- 0.105: Entz
- 0.106: Moulde
- 0.107: Adige
- 0.108: Adigére
- 0.109: Gog
- 0.110: Magog
- 0.111: Balaam
- 0.112: Moloch
- 0.113: Vincennes
- 0.114: Aisne
- 0.115: Aube
- 0.116: Saône
- 0.117: Doubs
- 0.118: Vesle
- 0.119: Saulce
- 0.120: St-Maur

== Service history ==
The locomotives were used for mixed service and over the years were assigned to most of the depots of the Chemins de fer de l'Est. The first retirements occurred in 1891. In 1926 nine locomotives were still in service, the Est 0.42, 0.45, 0.92, 0.114 and 0.118 from 1851 to 1853, and the 0.34, 0.81, 0.113 and 0.115, with an increased boiler pressure of 9 and 11 kg/cm^{2} (0.883 and 1.08 MPa; 128 and 156 psi). The last locomotive in service, the Est 0.42, was removed from service in 1928.
