= Jean-Jacques Meyer =

Jean-Jacques Meyer (1805–1877) was a French engineer, noted for his work with steam engines and steam locomotives.

== Innovations ==
=== Background ===
He was trained at the engineering school Arts et Métiers ParisTech.

=== Expansion valve ===
His first major invention was the Meyer expansion valve, used to improve efficiency in stationary steam engines. The first locomotives to use this invention were a pair of 2-2-2 locomotives Mayer built for the Chemin de fer de Strasbourg à Bâle in 1842. Named L'Espérance (Hope) and Le Succès (Success), they continued in service for S-B's successor, the Chemins de fer de l'Est until 1859.

=== Articulated locomotive ===
He was the originator of the articulated locomotives which bear his name. Meyer registered his first patent describing the system in 1861. The Meyer locomotive comprised:

- a rigid single frame supporting cabin, and boiler;
- two revolving units like bogies made up each one of a steam engine involving a group of driving wheels and possibly comprising carrying wheels.

The first engine of this type built by the Société J. F. Cail & Cie. in 1868 was a 0-4-0+0-4-0 named L'Avenir (Future). The design was developed by Gaston du Bousquet, who designed a class of 0-6-2+2-6-0 tank locomotives for hauling heavy goods trains on the Chemins de fer du Nord and the Chemins de fer de Ceinture de Paris.

== Sources ==
The above information is taken from the French Wikipedia article on the subject.

== Bibliography ==
- Davies, John (January 1997). Chemins de fer du Nord Locomotive List 1842–1938. Sunnybank, Queensland: Dr. John Davies. ISBN 0-646-30938-2.
- Davies, John (July 2001). Chemins de fer de l’Est Locomotive List 1839–1938 (Third ed.). Woodbridge, Queensland: Dr. John Davies. ISBN 0-646-06600-5.
