= Est 501 to 562 =

Class of 62 French 2-4-0 locomotives

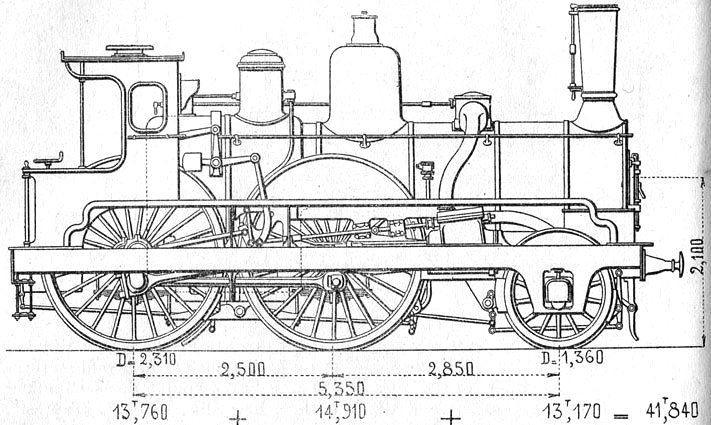
- Est 501 to 510
Type and origin
- Power type: Steam
- Designer: M. Regray
- Build date: 1878–1886
- Total produced: 62
Specifications
- Configuration
  - Whyte: 2-4-0
  - UIC: 1B n2
- Gauge: 1,435 mm (4 ft 8 1/2 in)
- Leading dia.: 1,350 mm (4 ft 5 1/8 in)
- Driver dia.: 501–510: 2,310 mm (7 ft 7 in); 511–562: 2,110 mm (6 ft 11 1/8 in)
- Wheelbase: 5.35 m (17 ft 6 3/4 in)
- Length: 501–510: 8.43 m (27 ft 7 7/8 in); 543–562: 8.93 m (29 ft 3 5/8 in)
- Adhesive weight: 28.7–29 t (63,300–63,900 lb)
- Loco weight: 41.8–42.8 t (92,200–94,400 lb)
- Firebox
  - Grate area: 501–510: 1.73 m^{2} (18.6 sq ft); 543–562: 2.39 m^{2} (25.7 sq ft)
- Boiler pressure: 10 kg/cm^{2} (0.981 MPa; 142 psi)
- Heating surface: 501–510: 100 m^{2} (1,100 sq ft); 543–562: 115 m^{2} (1,240 sq ft)
- Cylinders: Two, outside
- Cylinder size: 501–510: 440 mm × 640 mm (17 5/16 in × 25 3/16 in); 543–562: 430 mm × 610 mm (16 15/16 in × 24 in)
- Valve gear: Gooch
Performance figures
- Maximum speed: 90 km/h (56 mph)
Career
- Operators: Chemins de fer de l'Est
- Numbers: 501 – 562
- Retired: 1906–1938

Est 501 to 562 was a class of 62 French 2-4-0 locomotives for express passenger service, built in 1878–1886 for the Chemins de fer de l'Est.

== Construction history ==
The first series Est 501–510 was built 1878–1879 at the workshops of the Chemins de fer de l'Est in Épernay. The general design of the frame was carried over from the earlier Crampton locomotives, but with an additional coupled axle replacing the second leading axle. The first few machines had a round-top firebox which protruded down between the two driving axles, while the later machines of this series had a Belpaire firebox which extended over the second coupled axle. The boiler tubes had a length of 3.5 m (11 ft 5 3/4 in) and the steam regulator was of the Crampton type with the steam pipes running down to the cylinders externally. The Cylinders were placed horizontally on both sides between the double longerons of the frame with the connecting rod directly driving the second driving axle. The driving wheels had a diameter of 2,310 mm (7 ft 7 in).

The second series, comprising Est 511–542, was built in 1881–1882 in two subseries at Cail (1881) and Wiener Neustadt (1882). The diameter of the driving wheels was reduced to 2,110 mm (6 ft 11 1/8 in), and also the firebox was changed to one with a rounded top which also extended over the second coupled axle. The reversing mechanism of the Gooch valve gear was rearranged. Also the cylinder size was reduced to 430 mm × 610 mm (16 15/16 in × 24 in) on the machines Est 523-542.

The third and last series, Est 543–562, was built 1884–1885. The main differences compared to the preceding Est 523-542 series was the lengthening of the boiler and boiler tubes, which now had a length of 4.1 m (13 ft 5 3/8 in). Also the cylinder size had been increased to 440 mm × 610 mm (17 5/16 in × 24 in).

In 1888, two locomotives of the first series, Est 508 and 509, were fitted experimentally with dual drum Flaman boilers with a boiler pressure of 12 kg/cm^{2} (1.18 MPa; 171 psi). Due to the increased weight the leading axle had been replaced by a two-axle outside-frame bogie. Although these machines apparently did not meet the expectation, they still remained in service until 1925.

In order to increase the available traction, 48 locomotives of the series 511–562 had their driving wheels reduced from 2.11 m (6 ft 11 1/8 in) diameter down to 1.85 m (6 ft 7/8 in), which was sufficient to pull the local trains on the main and secondary lines. The locomotives were also renumbered to the range 2511–2562.

The series Est 501–510 used a two-axle tender with a capacity of 10 m^{3} (350 cu ft) water and 2.5 t (5,510 lb) coal and weighing a total of 24 t (52,900 lb), while the series Est 543–562 used a two-axle tender with a capacity of 13 m^{3} (460 cu ft) water and 3 t (6,610 lb) coal and weighing a total of 29 t (63,900 lb).

Year	Qty.	Est No.	Manufacturer
1878–1879	10	501–510	Épernay Works
1881	12	511–522	Société J. F. Cail & Cie
1882	20	523–542	Wiener Neustadt
1884–1885	20	543–562	Épernay Works
