= Est 613 to 742 =

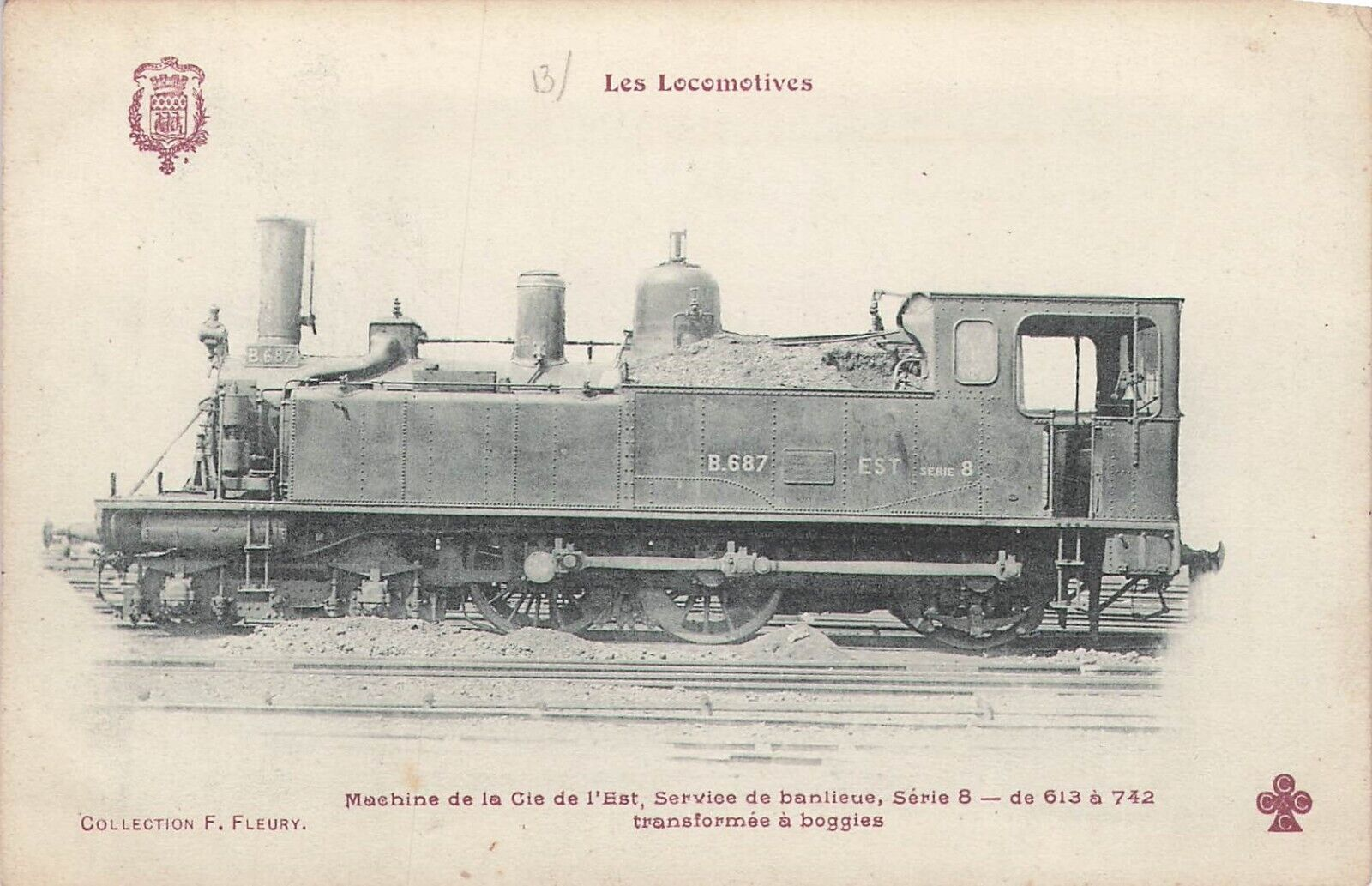
Type and origin
- Power type: Steam
- Build date: 613–683: 1881–1884; 684–742: 1890–1895
- Total produced: 130
Specifications
- Configuration
  - Whyte: 0-6-2T
  - UIC: C1 n2t
- Gauge: 1,435 mm (4 ft 8 1/2 in)
- Driver dia.: 1.56 m (5 ft 1 3/8 in)
- Trailing dia.: 1.36 m (4 ft 5 1/2 in)
- Wheelbase: 613–683: 5.05 m (16 ft 6 3/4 in); 684–742: 5.28 m (17 ft 3 3/4 in)
- Length: 613–683: 10.82 m (35 ft 6 in); 684–742: 11.25 m (36 ft 11 in)
- Adhesive weight: 613–683: 42.352 t (93,400 lb); 684–742: 45.2 t (99,600 lb)
- Loco weight: 613–683: 55.662 t (123,000 lb); 684–742: 60.0 t (132,000 lb)
- Fuel type: Coal
- Firebox
  - Type: Crampton
  - Grate area: 613–683: 1.82 m^{2} (19.6 sq ft); 684–742: 2.26 m^{2} (24.3 sq ft)
- Boiler pressure: 613–683: 10 kg/cm^{2} (0.981 MPa; 142 psi); 684–742: 12 kg/cm^{2} (1.18 MPa; 171 psi)
- Heating surface: 613–683: 110.38 m^{2} (1,188.1 sq ft); 684–742: 129 m^{2} (1,390 sq ft)
- Cylinders: Two, inside
- Cylinder size: 460 mm × 600 mm (18 1/8 in × 23 5/8 in)
- Valve gear: Stephenson
Performance figures
- Maximum speed: 75 km/h (47 mph)
Career
- Operators: Chemins de fer de l'Est
- Numbers: Est: 613–742; SNCF: 1-031 TA 641–741

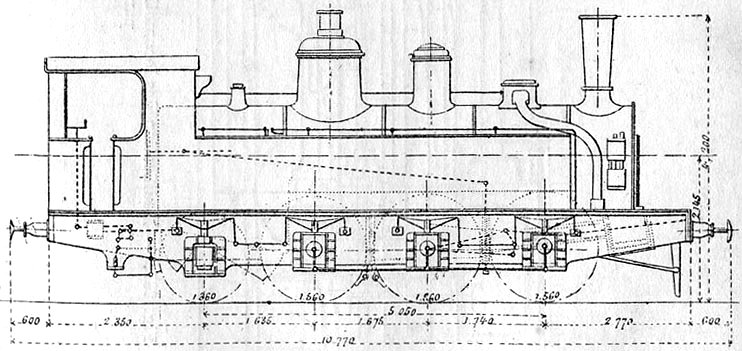

The Est 613 to 742 were 0-6-2T locomotives for suburban passenger traffic of the Chemins de fer de l'Est. They were first put in service in 1881.

== Construction history ==
The first series of 10 machines (Est 613 – 622) was built in 1880–1881 in the workshops of the Est at Épernay. The locomotives proved satisfactory, and so further machines were built by SACM (Est 623 – 673) and Cail (Est 674 – 683), reaching a total of 71 machines in 1884.

In 1890 a new series of 9 machines (Est 684 – 692) was built at Épernay Works. These locomotives had increased in size, with firebox and heating area as well as boiler pressure increased. In the years 1892–1895 the locomotive stock was further augmented with new batches (Est 693 – 742) of the same type, finally reaching a total of 130 machines in 1895.

Production batches
Build date	Order date	Quantity	Est Numbers	Manufacturer	Serial No.
1881	1880	10	613 – 622	Épernay Works (Est)	172 – 181
1881–1882	5 Oct 1880	10	623 – 632	SACM-Belfort	2984–2993
1882–1883	11 Aug 1881	18	633 – 650	SACM-Graffenstaden	3302–3319
1884	18 Sep 1883	23	651 – 673	SACM-Graffenstaden	3513–3535
1884	17 Apr 1884	10	674 – 683	Cail	2246–2255
1890		9	684 – 692	Épernay Works	222–230
1892		12	693 – 704	Épernay Works	243 – 254
1894		24	705 – 728	Épernay Works	271 – 294
1895	Jun 1894	14	729 – 742	Batignolles	1294–1307

In 1898–1899 fifty locomotives of the later batches (Est 684 – 692, 693 – 704, 705 – 733) were rebuilt as 4-6-0T locomotives and renumbered to Est B 684 – B 733, later SNCF series 230 TA.

In 1905 twenty-five locomotives of the earlier series (Est 613 – 637) were modified for shunting and were renumbered as Est G 613 – G 637.

In 1905–1907 the 45 locomotives Est G 613 – G 637 and Est 647 – 666 were rebuilt as 2-6-2T locomotives and were renumbered to Est V 613 – V 637 and Est V 647 – V 666, later SNCF series 131 TA.

The machines Est 638–746, 667–683 and 734–742 remained in their original state. In 1929 the first machines (Est 600, 639, 640) were withdrawn. 14 machines were still in service on 1 Jan 1938 and were renumbered to SNCF 031 TA 641–741.
