= Est 0.250 to 0.500 and 0.701 to 0.766 =

Type and origin
- Power type: Steam
- Build date: 1859–1884
Specifications
- Configuration
  - Whyte: 0-6-0
  - UIC: C n2
- Gauge: 1,435 mm (4 ft 8 1/2 in)
- Driver dia.: 1.42 m (4 ft 7 7/8 in)
- Wheelbase: 3.55 m (11 ft 7 3/4 in)
- Length: Type 23: 8.44 m (27 ft 8 in); Type 29: 8.56 m (28 ft 1 in); Type 45: 8.76 m (28 ft 9 in)
- Loco weight: Type 23: 33.3 t (73,400 lb); Type 29: 32.7 t (72,100 lb); Type 45: 36.6 t (80,700 lb)
- Fuel type: Coal
- Firebox
  - Type: Crampton
  - Grate area: Type 23: 1.35 m^{2} (14.5 sq ft); Type 29: 1.35 m^{2} (14.5 sq ft); Type 45: 1.63 m^{2} (17.5 sq ft)
- Boiler pressure: Type 23: 8–9 kg/cm^{2} (0.785–0.883 MPa; 114–128 psi); Type 29: 8–9 kg/cm^{2} (0.785–0.883 MPa; 114–128 psi); Type 45: 9–13 kg/cm^{2} (0.883–1.27 MPa; 128–185 psi)
- Heating surface: Type 23: 115 m^{2} (1,240 sq ft); Type 29: 127 m^{2} (1,370 sq ft); Type 45: 110 m^{2} (1,200 sq ft)
- Cylinders: Two, outside
- Cylinder size: 440 mm × 660 mm (17 5/16 in × 26 in)
- Valve gear: Stephenson
Performance figures
- Maximum speed: 50 km/h (31 mph)
Career
- Operators: Chemins de fer de l'Est
- Numbers: 0.250–0.299 (Type 23); 0.300–0.349 (Type 29); 0.350–0.478 (Type 23); 0.479–0.500 (Type 45); 0.701–0.766 (Type 45)
- Nicknames: Bourbonnais

The Est 0.250 to 0.500 and 0.701 to 0.766 were 0-6-0 locomotives for freight traffic of the Chemins de fer de l'Est. They were first put in service in 1859 and retired from service from 1892 until 1937.

== Construction history ==
The first series of machines was built 1858-1862 by Schneider-Creusot for the Compagnie des chemins de fer des Ardennes, which later merged with the Chemins de fer de l'Est in 1863. The series then received the numbers Est 0.300-0.350.

Already in 1859 the design had been adopted by the Chemins de fer de l'Est, which had the type built from 1859 to 1884 without significant changes by their own workshops as well as various other manufacturers as series Est 0.250-0299 and 0.350-0.478.

In 1881-1882 the locomotives Est 0.479-0.500 as well as 0.701-0.708, and in 1883-1884 the 0.709-0.766 were put into service. Due to their longer fireboxes these later machines had an increased power output. The firegrate area had been increased from 1.35 m^{2} (14.5 sq ft) to 1.63 m^{2} (17.5 sq ft). The new boiler had a boiler pressure of 9 kg/cm^{2} (0.883 MPa; 128 psi) and the machine's adhesive weight increased to 36.6 t (80,700 lb), while tractive effort was 5,329 kg (11,700 lb).

Production batches
Build date	Quantity	Est Numbers	Type	Manufacturer
1859–1864	28	0.250 – 0.277	23	Schneider - Le Creusot
1859–1864	22	0.278 – 0.299	23	Épernay Works (Est)
1858–1862	50	0.300 – 0.349	29	Schneider - Le Creusot
1868	51	0.350 – 0.400	23	Épernay Works
1867	20	0.401 – 0.420	23	Koechlin
1869–1884	58	0.421 – 0.478	23	Épernay Works
1881	22	0.479 – 0.500	45	Schneider - Le Creusot
1882–1884	8	0.701 – 0.708	45	Schneider - Le Creusot
1882–1884	3	0.709, 0.710, 0.766	45	Épernay Works
1882–1884	30	0.711 – 0.740	45	SACM
1882–1884	25	0.741 – 0.765	45	Schneider - Le Creusot

From 1904 to 1909 forty-eight of the machines from series 0.252-0.428 were rebuilt as 2-6-0 two-cylinder compound locomotives. These 48 machines were renumbered as Est 30.252 to 30.428, retaining their original numbers with an additional prefix of '3' as follows:

- 30.252
- 30.279
- 30.281
- 30.282
- 30.290
- 30.292
- 30.293
- 30.294
- 30.295
- 30.298
- 30.304
- 30.311
- 30.313
- 30.315
- 30.317
- 30.318
- 30.320
- 30.321
- 30.323
- 30.324
- 30.325
- 30.326
- 30.343
- 30.349
- 30.352
- 30.353
- 30.354
- 30.362
- 30.366
- 30.368
- 30.373
- 30.375
- 30.377
- 30.390
- 30.392
- 30.395
- 30.396
- 30.397
- 30.399
- 30.403
- 30.407
- 30.411
- 30.412
- 30.413
- 30.415
- 30.418
- 30.425
- 30.428

From 1906 to 1926 ninety-two of the machines from series 0.254-0.489 and 0.701-0.766 were rebuilt as 2-6-0 locomotives with simple expansion. The 92 machines were renumbered as Est 30.254 to 30.766, retaining their original numbers with an additional prefix of '3' as follows:

- 30.254
- 30.255
- 30.256
- 30.260
- 30.264
- 30.265
- 30.266
- 30.268
- 30.269
- 30.272
- 30.275
- 30.289
- 30.297
- 30.302
- 30.303
- 30.305
- 30.306
- 30.307
- 30.310
- 30.327
- 30.329
- 30.333
- 30.335
- 30.337
- 30.338
- 30.339
- 30.345
- 30.346
- 30.347
- 30.348
- 30.356
- 30.381
- 30.385
- 30.391
- 30.393
- 30.400
- 30.410
- 30.414
- 30.416
- 30.417
- 30.429
- 30.431
- 30.432
- 30.433
- 30.434
- 30.435
- 30.437
- 30.438
- 30.439
- 30.441
- 30.442
- 30.443
- 30.444
- 30.445
- 30.446
- 30.447
- 30.450
- 30.451
- 30.452
- 30.453
- 30.456
- 30.457
- 30.458
- 30.461
- 30.462
- 30.463
- 30.464
- 30.465
- 30.467
- 30.468
- 30.469
- 30.471
- 30.472
- 30.474
- 30.475
- 30.476
- 30.477
- 30.478
- 30.480
- 30.489
- 30.701
- 30.702
- 30.704
- 30.709
- 30.710
- 30.723
- 30.732
- 30.733
- 30.742
- 30.745
- 30.763
- 30.766

== Locomotive names ==
The locomotives of the earlier series received names. They were named as follows:

Series 0.250 – 0.299:

- 0.250: Chine
- 0.251: Tartarie
- 0.252: Tibet
- 0.253: Tonkin
- 0.254: Cochinchine
- 0.255: Japon
- 0.256: Himalaya
- 0.257: Altai
- 0.258: Pékin
- 0.259: Nankin
- 0.260: Canton
- 0.261: Shang-Hai
- 0.262: Hong-Kong
- 0.263: Macao
- 0.264:
- 0.265: Siam
- 0.266: Montebello
- 0.267: Palestro
- 0.268: Turbigo
- 0.269: Magenta
- 0.270: Marignan
- 0.271: Solférino
- 0.272: Venise
- 0.273: Mantoue
- 0.274: Vérone
- 0.275: Bologne
- 0.276: Milan
- 0.277: Plaisance
- 0.278: Edwards
- 0.279: Viguier
- 0.280: Polonceau
- 0.281: Clapeyron
- 0.282: Bourdon
- 0.283: Gay-Lussac
- 0.284: Thénard
- 0.285: Cherbourg
- 0.286: Brest
- 0.287: Lorient
- 0.288: Rouchefort
- 0.289: Toulon
- 0.290: Marseille
- 0.291: Bordeaux
- 0.292: Nantes
- 0.293: Havre
- 0.294: Dunkerque
- 0.295: Calais
- 0.296: Boulogne
- 0.297: Dieppe
- 0.298: Sète
- 0.299: Nice

Series 0.300 – 0.349:

- 0.300: Aisne
- 0.301: Marne
- 0.302: Meuse
- 0.303: Moselle
- 0.304: Orne
- 0.305: Oise
- 0.306: Somme
- 0.307: Sambre
- 0.308: Aube
- 0.309: Escaut
- 0.310: Ourcq
- 0.311: Vesle
- 0.312: Semoy
- 0.313: Chiers
- 0.314: Suippe
- 0.315: Vence
- 0.316: Oison
- 0.317: Ornain
- 0.318: Auge
- 0.319: Sarre
- 0.320: Sormonne
- 0.321: Retourne
- 0.322: Bar
- 0.323: Saulx
- 0.324: Aire
- 0.325: Biesne
- 0.326: Veaux
- 0.327: Blaise
- 0.328: Blies
- 0.329: Tou
- 0.330: Seille
- 0.331: Miette
- 0.332: Crusne
- 0.333: Marton
- 0.334: Surmelin
- 0.335: Coole
- 0.336: Fensch
- 0.337: Moivre
- 0.338: Flon
- 0.339: Maholte
- 0.340: Cuse
- 0.341: Vendy
- 0.342: Grand Morin
- 0.343: Yron
- 0.344: Vrigne
- 0.345: Givonne
- 0.346: Fresnois
- 0.347: Viron
- 0.348: Marche
- 0.349: Marspich

Series 0.350 – 0.387:

- 0.350: La Rochelle
- 0.351: St-Nazaire
- 0.352: St-Malo
- 0.353: Granville
- 0.354: Honfleur
- 0.355: Algérie
- 0.356: Sénégal
- 0.357: Guyane
- 0.358: Guadeloupe
- 0.359: Martinique
- 0.360: Vera-Cruz
- 0.361: Puebla
- 0.362: Mexico
- 0.363: Orizaba
- 0.364: La Senora
- 0.365: Cugnot
- 0.366: Séguin
- 0.367: Crapton
- 0.368: Engerth
- 0.369: Giffard
- 0.370: Morin
- 0.371: Poncelet
- 0.372: Bessemer
- 0.373: Vitruve
- 0.374: Copernic
- 0.375: Euler
- 0.376: Bernouilli
- 0.377: Pascal
- 0.378: Descartes
- 0.379: Olivier de Serres
- 0.380: Parmentier
- 0.381: Jenner
- 0.382: Galvani
- 0.383: Wheastone
- 0.384: Rhumkorff
- 0.385: Daguerre
- 0.386: Prony
- 0.387: Foucault

Series 0.401 – 0.420 (named after Merovingians):

- 0.401: Pharamond
- 0.402: Clodion
- 0.403: Mérovée
- 0.404: Childéric I
- 0.405: Clovis I
- 0.406: Childebert I
- 0.407: Clotaire I
- 0.408: Caribert
- 0.409: Chilpéric I
- 0.410: Clotaire II
- 0.411: Dagobert I
- 0.412: Clovis II
- 0.413: Clotaire III
- 0.414: Childéric II
- 0.415: Thierry I
- 0.416: Clovis III
- 0.417: Childebert II
- 0.418:
- 0.419: Clotaire IV
- 0.420: Chilpéric II
