= Est 4401 to 4512 =

SNCF 141.TB
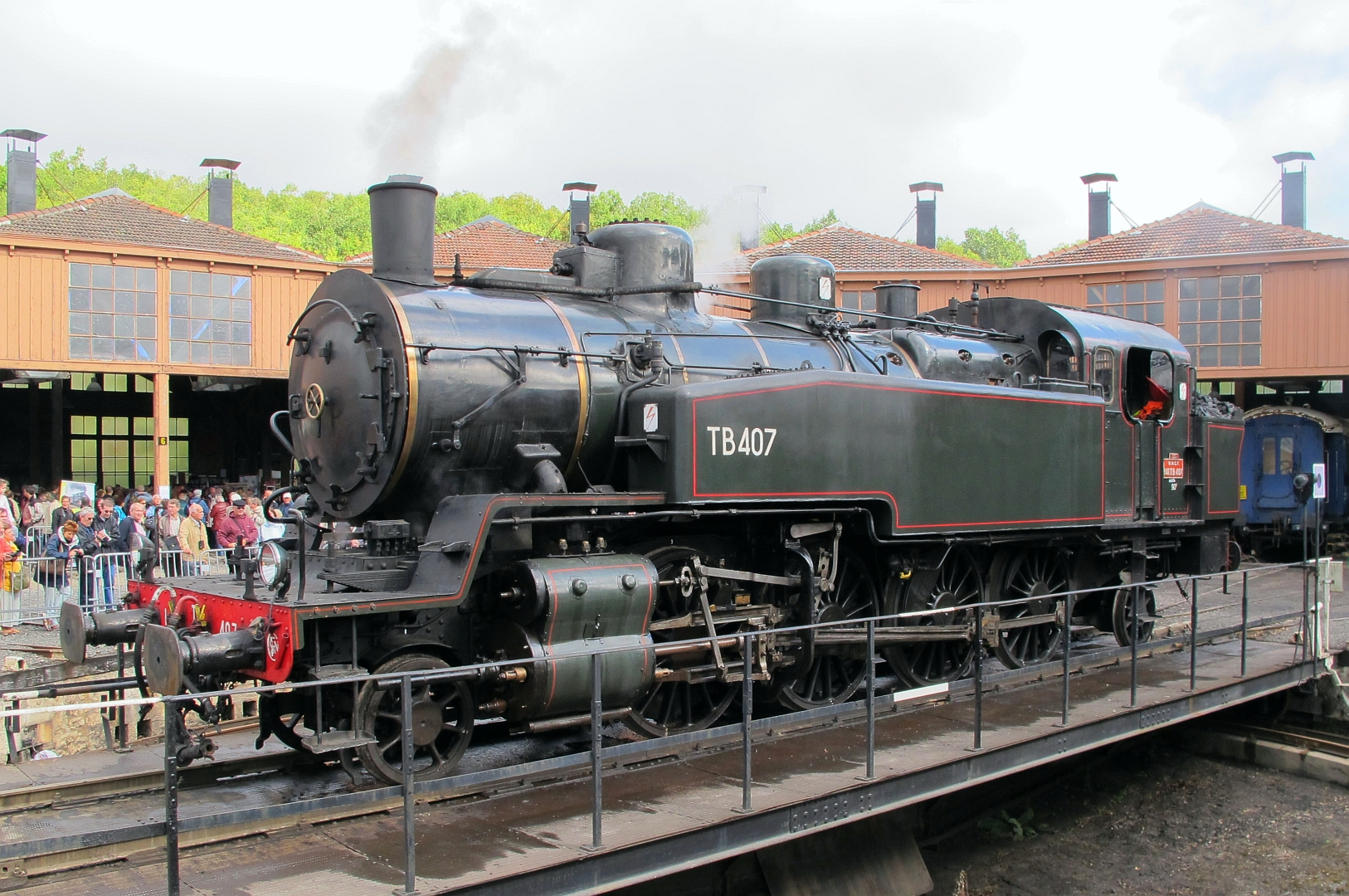
- 141 TB 407 at Longueville shed in 2011.
Type and origin
- Power type: Steam
- Total produced: 112
Specifications
- Configuration
  - Whyte: 2-8-2T
  - UIC: 1′D1′ h2t
- Gauge: 4 ft 8 1/2 in (1,435 mm)
- Driver dia.: 1.58 m (62 in)
- Length: 13.74 m (45 ft 1 in)
- Loco weight: 92.1 t (90.6 long tons; 101.5 short tons)
- Fuel type: Coal
- Firebox
  - Grate area: 2.42 m^{2} (26.0 sq ft)
- Boiler pressure: 1.6 MPa (230 psi)
- Cylinders: Two, outside
- Cylinder size: 550 mm × 660 mm (21.7 in × 26.0 in)
Performance figures
- Maximum speed: 90 km/h (56 mph)
- Power output: 882 kW (1,183 hp) at 80 km/h (50 mph)
Career
- Locale: France

Est 4401 to 4512 were a class of Mikado (2-8-2) tank locomotives which were designed for service on the Paris suburban lines of the Compagnie des chemins de fer de l'Est. The Est placed them in power class (série) 11s. On nationalisation in 1938 they passed to the SNCF, who renumbered them 1-141.TB.401 to 1–141.TB.512.

== Origins ==
The Est's first class of 2-8-2T locomotives were introduced in 1911 with the construction of two prototypes, numbered 4401 and 4402. They were designed under the leadership of CME Louis Salomon, and built in the Company workshops at Épernay. They were followed by a further 110 locomotives, delivered between 1913 and 1917. An order for 50 further locos once thought necessary was never constructed because of the First World War. The class was built by four manufacturers in six blocks:

Est 141 TB locomotives
No. EST	Builder	Year entered service	No. SNCF
4401-4402	Company workshops at Épernay	1913	141 TB 401-402
4403-4417	Blanc-Misseron	1913	141 TB 403-417
4418-4432	Saint-Léonard at Liège	1913	141 TB 418-432
4433-4462	Company workshops at Épernay	1913-1914	141 TB 433-462
4463-4492	Cail	1914	141 TB 463-492
4493-4512	Company workshops at Épernay	1915-1917	141 TB 493-512

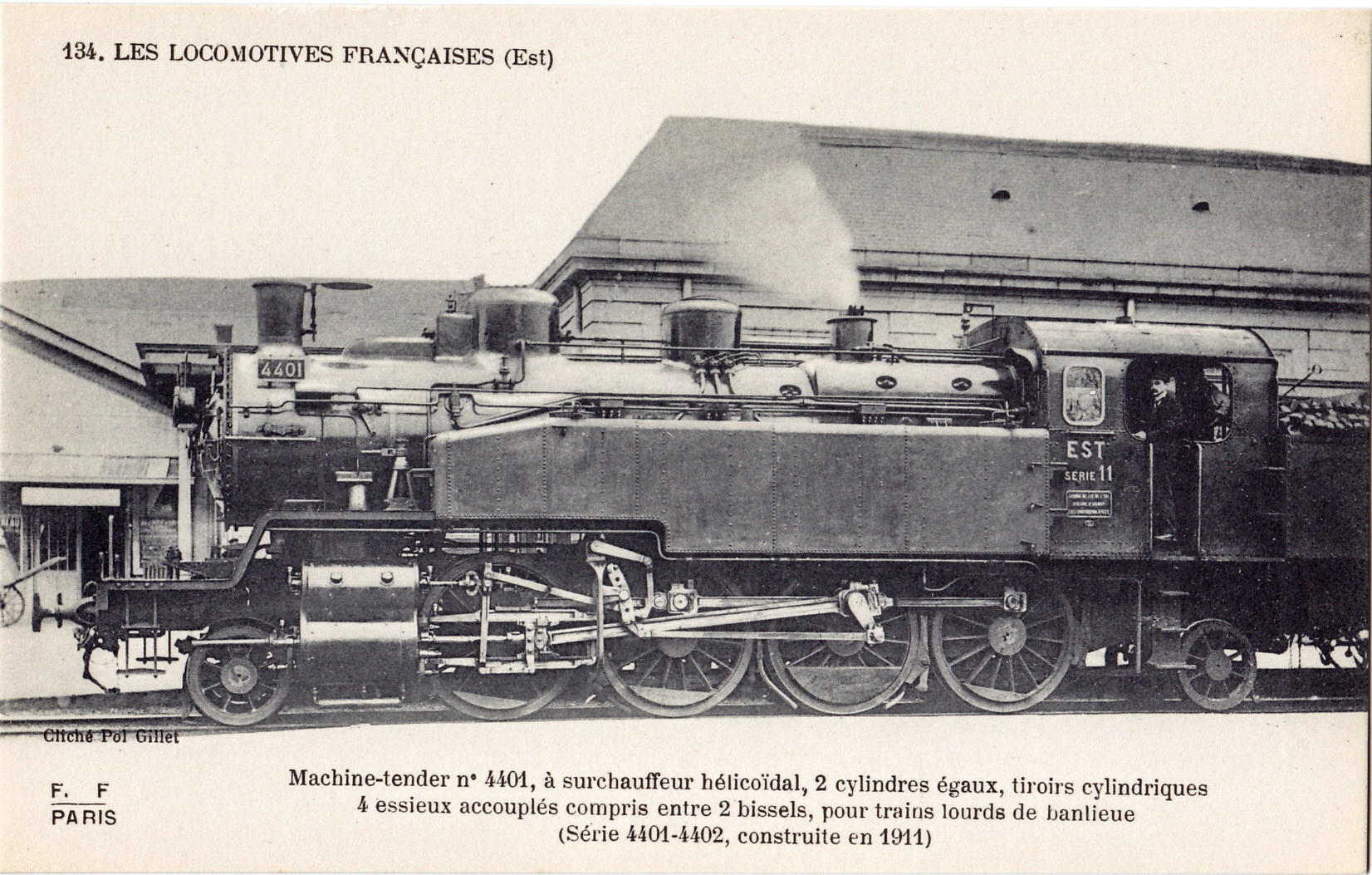
The first machine, constructed at Épernay

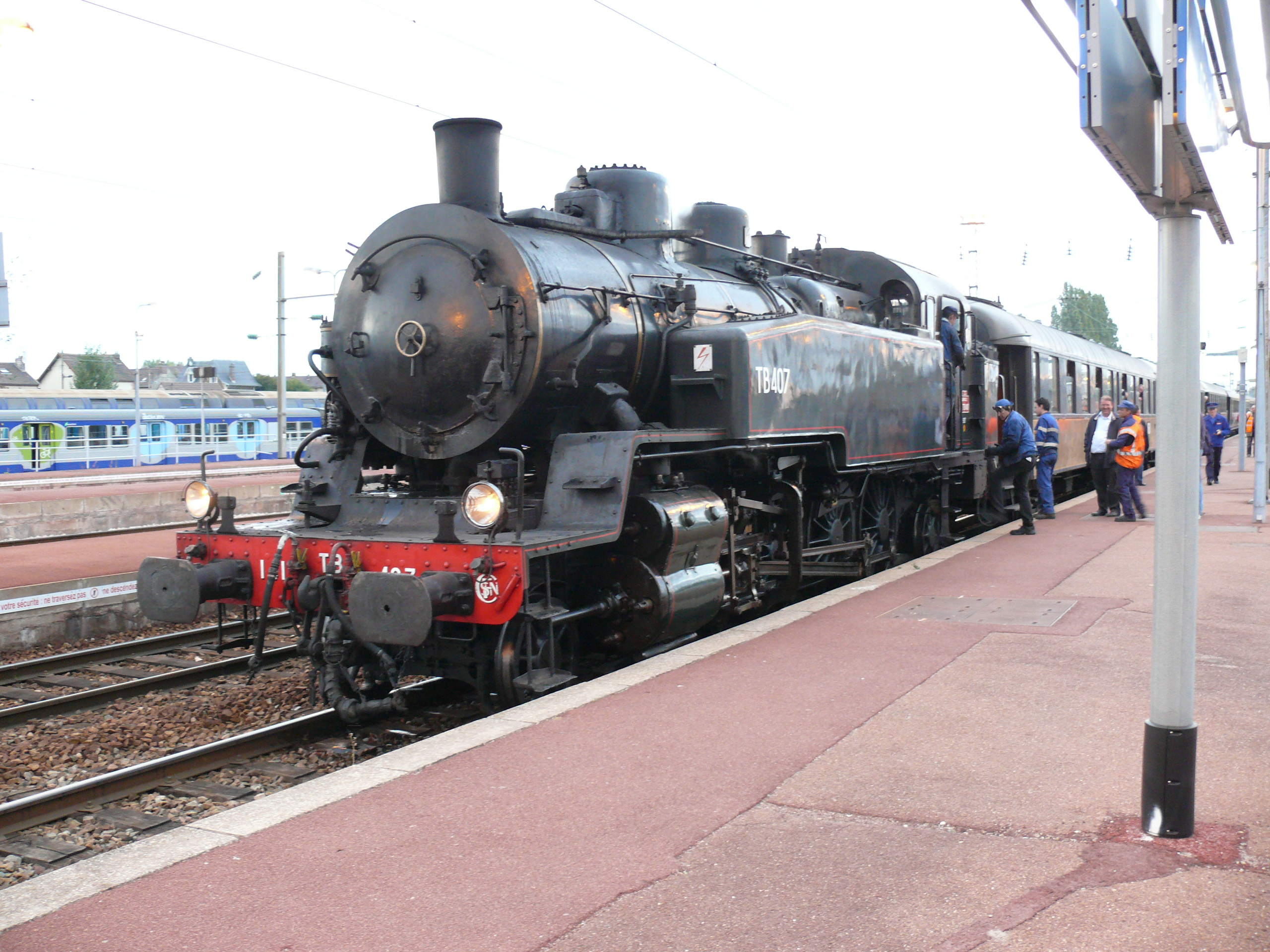
141 TB 407 of AJECTA at Persan-Beaumont station.

== Description ==
These locomotives were two-cylinder simple-expansion engines, with Walschaerts valve gear. They had a Belpaire firebox and the exhaust was later replaced by a PLM three-ring type. They had carrying wheels at both ends, in Bissel trucks of "Est" type allowing lateral movement of ±90 mm. Only the driving wheels were braked. In the 1920s these locomotives were fitted for push-pull operation. This equipment has been removed from the preserved locomotives. Originally Nos. 4453-4462 were fitted with a "Caille Potonié" superheater which was later removed.

== Usage and services ==
These locomotives made up the largest tank locomotive class on the Compagnie des chemins de fer de l'Est and maintained the suburban service for Eastern Paris until the electrification of the Paris - Strasbourg line in 1962, being allocated to Noisy, Paris-La Villette and Vaires sheds. After that date they replaced the 2-6-2T locos of class 1-131 TB on the Vincennes line. They maintained that service until the eve of integration of the line with RER line A on 14 December 1969. Many of these locomotives were transferred to provincial sheds for varied work and yard shunting on minor routes where their small axle loading of 16 t (16 long tons; 18 short tons) was an advantage.

In 1932, 4433 underwent smoke-deflector trials, which were not followed up. 4438 received double slide-valves, a trial also not followed up.

On the formation of SNCF in 1938, the class was renumbered 1-141 TB 401 to 512 (there were only 110 locomotives because 4411 and 4413 had previously been withdrawn), and 15 locomotives were converted for push-pull operation.

Some locos were leased to Chemins de fer et transport automobile in Provins, i.e. 1-141 TB 407, 447, 455, 457, 460 and 500, which ran in the valley of the river Voulzie between Longueville and Villiers-Saint-Georges and lasted until 1972.

== Preserved locomotives ==
- 4407, which became SNCF 1-141 TB 407 joined AJECTA on 4 March 1972 at the Longueville roundhouse, where she was restored by the association.
- 4424, SNCF 1-141 TB 424 was preserved in 1999 by AAATV at Mulhouse. She was used by the Chemin de fer touristique du Rhin, which completely overhauled her boiler in 2009. In summer 2013 she was lent to La Vapeur du Trieux (Trieux Steam Railway) for the tourist line from Paimpol to Pontrieux
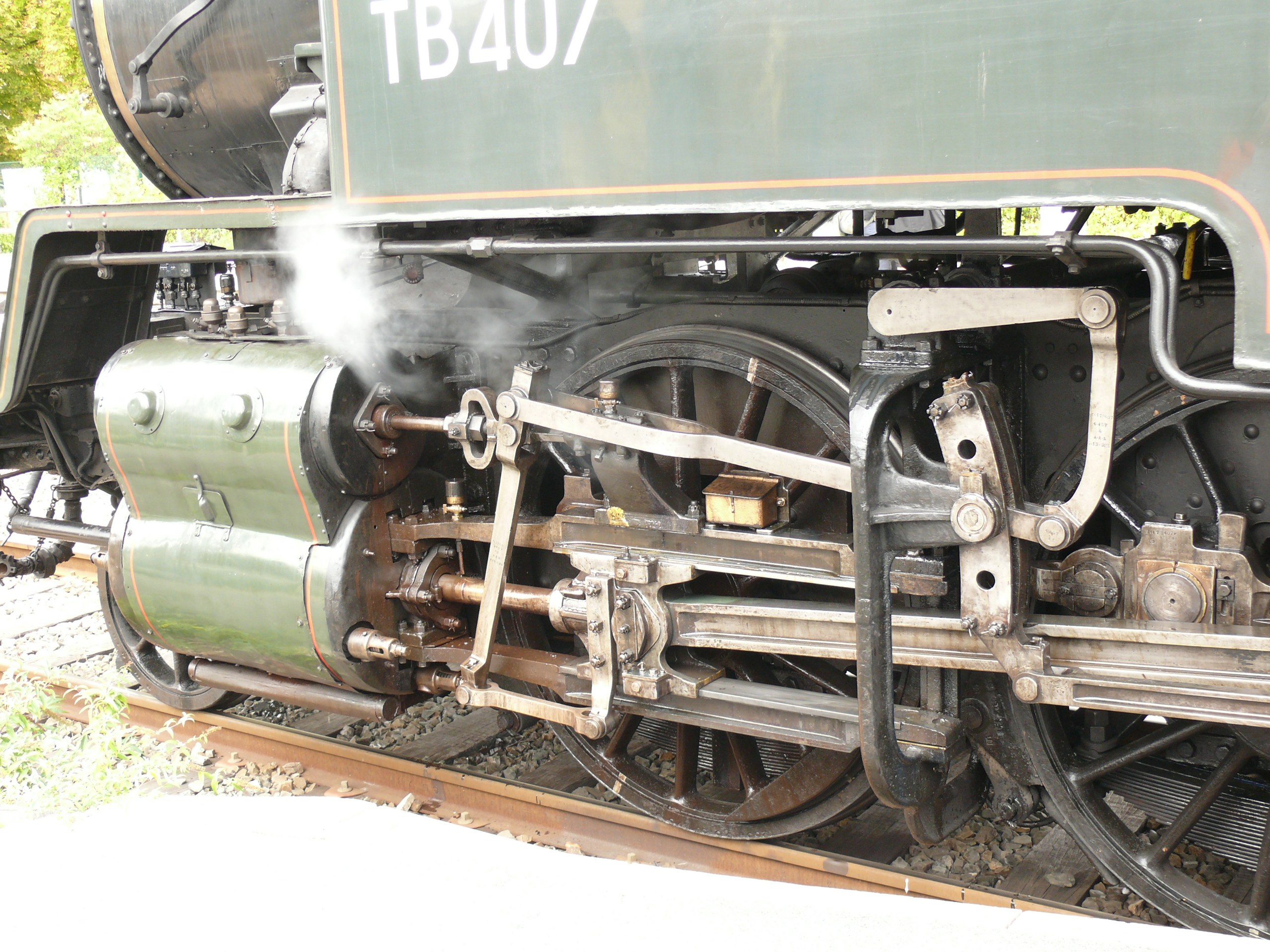
Motion and Walschaerts valve gear of 141 TB 407

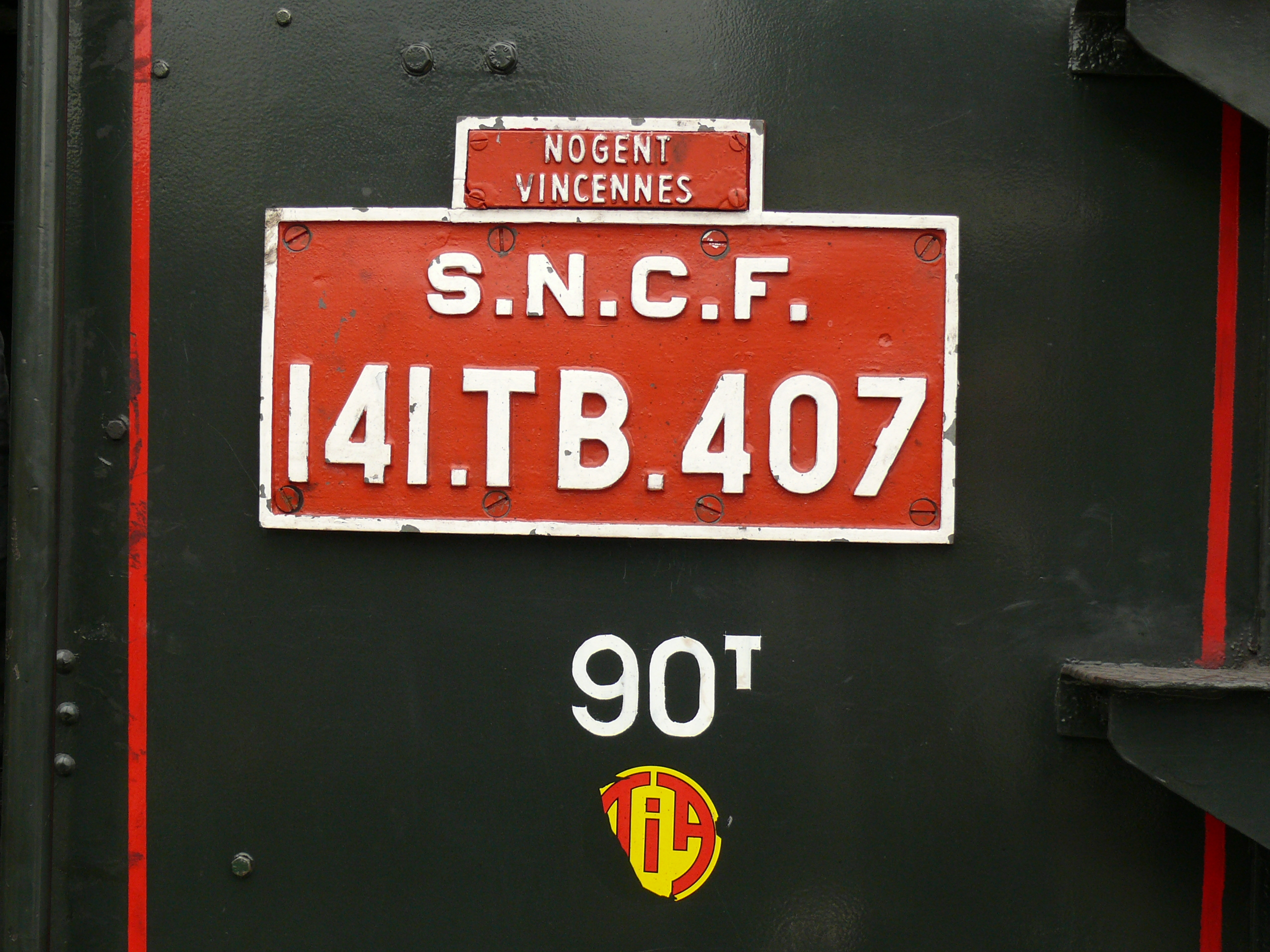
Plates on 141 TB 407, showing her old shed: Nogent-Vincennes

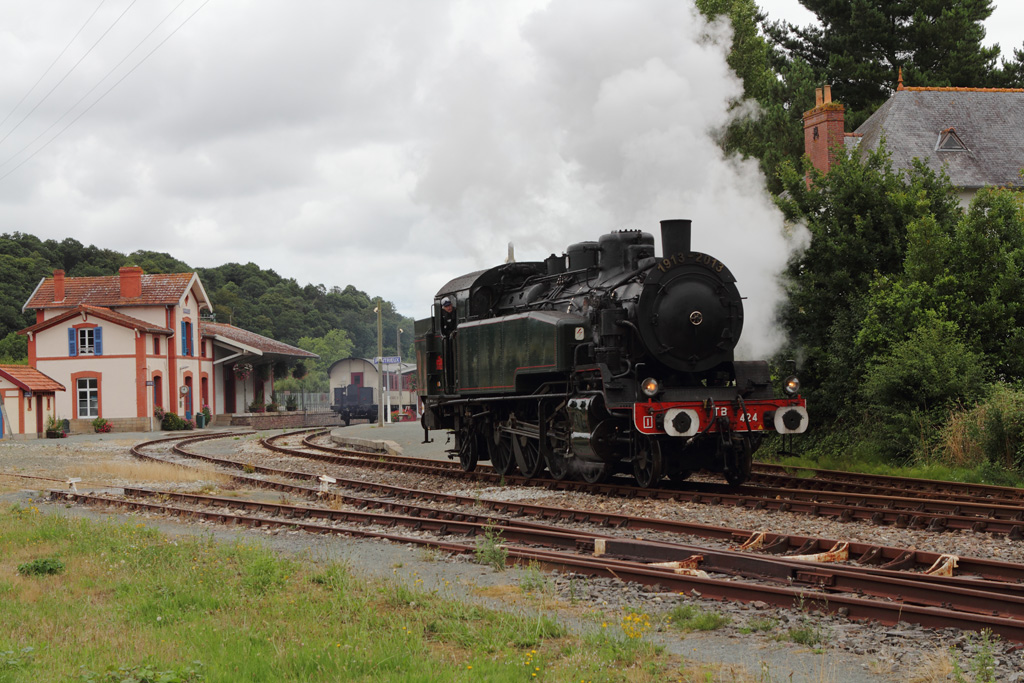
141 TB 424 running at Pontrieux on La Vapeur du Trieux

== Notes and references ==
- Translated from the French language Wikipedia, July 2014.

== Bibliography ==
- Poggi, J. L. (December 1979). "Souvenir de la vapeur : les 141 TB de la ligne de Vincennes". Rail Magazine (in French) (32). ISSN 0152-8084.
- Prévot, Aurélien (October 2009). "La ligne de Vincennes restée fidèle à la vapeur jusqu'à sa mort : il y a 40 ans, la fin des 1-141 TB de la Bastille". Ferrovissime (in French) (20): 2–20. ISSN 1961-5035.
- Alain Pillier, 141 TB 407, Loco ! Loco ! DVD, 55 minutes, ed. la Vie du Rail.
