= Est 0.501 to 0.691 =

Class of 191 French 0-8-0 locomotives

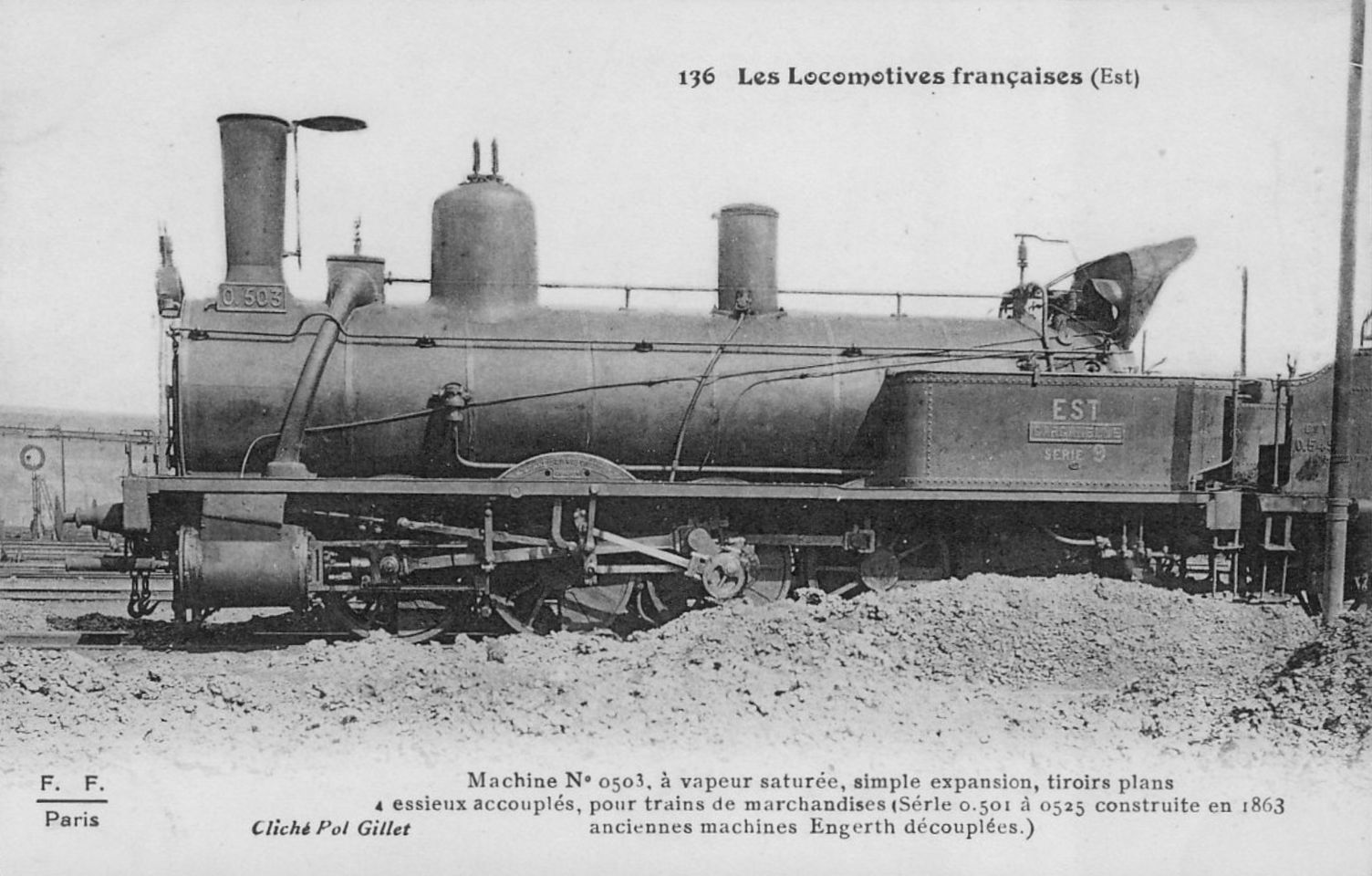
- 0-8-0 Locomotive 0.503 'Gargamelle' of the Chemins de fer de l'Est
Type and origin
- Power type: Steam
- Builder: Le Creusot (84); Graffenstaden (16); Fives-Lille (16); Ateliers d'Epernay (6); SACM (44); Cail (25)
- Build date: 1856–1886
- Total produced: 191
Specifications
- Configuration
  - Whyte: 0-8-0
  - UIC: D n2
- Gauge: 1,435 mm (4 ft 8 1/2 in)
- Driver dia.: 1,250 mm (4 ft 1 1/4 in)
- Wheelbase: 3.95 m (13 ft 0 in)
- Length: 0501–0525: 9.23 m (30 ft 3 in); 0526–0691: 9.41 m (30 ft 10 in)
- Adhesive weight: 52 t (115,000 lb)
- Loco weight: 46 t (101,000 lb)
- Firebox
  - Type: Crampton
  - Grate area: 1.92 m^{2} (20.7 sq ft)
- Boiler pressure: 9 or 10 kg/cm^{2} (0.883 or 0.981 MPa; 128 or 142 psi)
- Heating surface
  - Firebox: 9.90 m^{2} (106.6 sq ft)
  - Tubes: 178.10 m^{2} (1,917.1 sq ft)
  - Total surface: 188 m^{2} (2,020 sq ft)
- Cylinders: Two, outside
- Cylinder size: 500 mm × 660 mm (19 11/16 in × 26 in)
- Valve gear: Gooch
Performance figures
- Maximum speed: 45 km/h (28 mph)
- Power output: 780 CV (574 kW; 769 hp)
- Tractive effort: 11.8 or 13 t (26,000 or 28,700 lb)
Career
- Operators: Chemins de fer de l'Est; SNCF
- Power class: Est series 9
- Numbers: Est: 0.501 – 0.691; SNCF: 040 A 501 – 691
- Nicknames: Engerth

The Est 0.501 to 0.691, also denoted as Est 0501 to 0691, was a class of 191 French 0-8-0 locomotives for freight service, built from 1856 to 1886 for the Chemins de fer de l'Est.

== Construction history ==
The 25 locomotives of the first batch were originally delivered as 0-8-4 Engerth locomotives by Le Creusot in 1856–1857, with the fleet numbers 0.164 to 0.188. Due to the inherent inconveniences of the Engerth system, particularly in case of derailments, the decision was taken to rebuild these engines into locomotives with separate tenders, at which point they were also renumbered 0.501 to 0.525. Additionally the adhesive weight could be increased from 39.3 to 45.5 tons. The rebuilding work was carried out in the Est Company's workshops at Épernay from 1860 to 1868.

The wide firebox of the Engerth machines necessitated it to be placed outside of the wheels and therefore resulted in a large overhang, which had to be compensated on the rebuilt machines with a counterweight of 1,100 kg (2,425 lb) in the front of the engine. The counterweight was reduced to 800 kg (1,764 lb) in the following 38 machines of the subsequent orders from 1866 to 1872, and then finally omitted on the later series from 1880.

The subsequent batches were ordered with some differences from various manufacturers from 1866 to 1884.

| Date ordered | Date delivered | Qty. | Est Numbers | Type | Manufacturer | Serial numbers |
|---|---|---|---|---|---|---|
| 11 April 1854 | 1856–1857 | 25 | 0.501 – 0.525 | 24 | Schneider - Le Creusot | 222–246 |
| 25 January 1866 | 1866–1867 | 16 | 0.526 – 0.541 | 31 | Graffenstaden | 403–418 |
| 21 March 1866 | 1869 | 16 | 0.542 – 0.557 | 34 | Fives-Lille | 1668–1683 |
| 1870–1872 | 1872–1873 | 6 | 0.558 – 0.563 | 37 | Épernay Works | 114–119 |
| 12 April 1880 | 1881 | 12 | 0.564 – 0.575 | 44 | SACM - Graffenstaden | 3021–3032 |
| 7 July 1880 | 1881–1882 | 20 | 0.576 – 0.595 | 44 | SACM - Graffenstaden | 3118–3127, 3071–3080 |
| 12 January 1884 | 1886 | 46 | 0.596 – 0.641 | 44 | Schneider - Le Creusot | 2284–2293, 2308–2343 |
| 17 April 1884 | 1886 | 25 | 0.642 – 0.666 | 44 | Anciens Établissements Cail | 2221–2245 |
| 24 April 1884 | 1886 | 12 | 0.667 – 0.678 | 44 | SACM - Belfort | 3776–3787 |
| 24 April 1884 | 1886 | 13 | 0.678 – 0.691 | 44 | Schneider - Le Creusot | 2400–2412 |

The locomotives of the first series were named after fictional characters from the works of Rabelais:

- 0.501: Gargantua
- 0.502: Grandgousier
- 0.503: Gargamelle
- 0.504: Pantagruel
- 0.505: Panurge
- 0.506: Rondibilis
- 0.507: Alcofribas
- 0.508: Badebec
- 0.509: Bringuenarille
- 0.510: Bruslefer
- 0.511: Entommeures
- 0.512: Gabara
- 0.513: Gaster
- 0.514: Grippeminaud
- 0.515: Picrochole
- 0.516: Tourquedillon
- 0.517: Carpalin
- 0.518: Raminagrobis
- 0.519: Bridoie
- 0.520: Trinquamelle
- 0.521: Triboulet
- 0.522: Riflandouille
- 0.523: Tailleboudin
- 0.524: Nabuzardan
- 0.525: Saulpiquet

The locomotives of the series 0.526 – 0.541 were given the following names:

- 0.526: Bettembourg
- 0.527: Esche
- 0.528: Ottange
- 0.529: Mersch
- 0.530: Ettelbruck
- 0.531: Diekirch
- 0.532: Clervaux
- 0.533: Spa
- 0.534: Pépinster
- 0.535: Verviers
- 0.536: Liège
- 0.537: Seraing
- 0.538: Huy
- 0.539: Namur
- 0.540: Charleroi
- 0.541: Bruxelles
