= Est 441 to 485 =

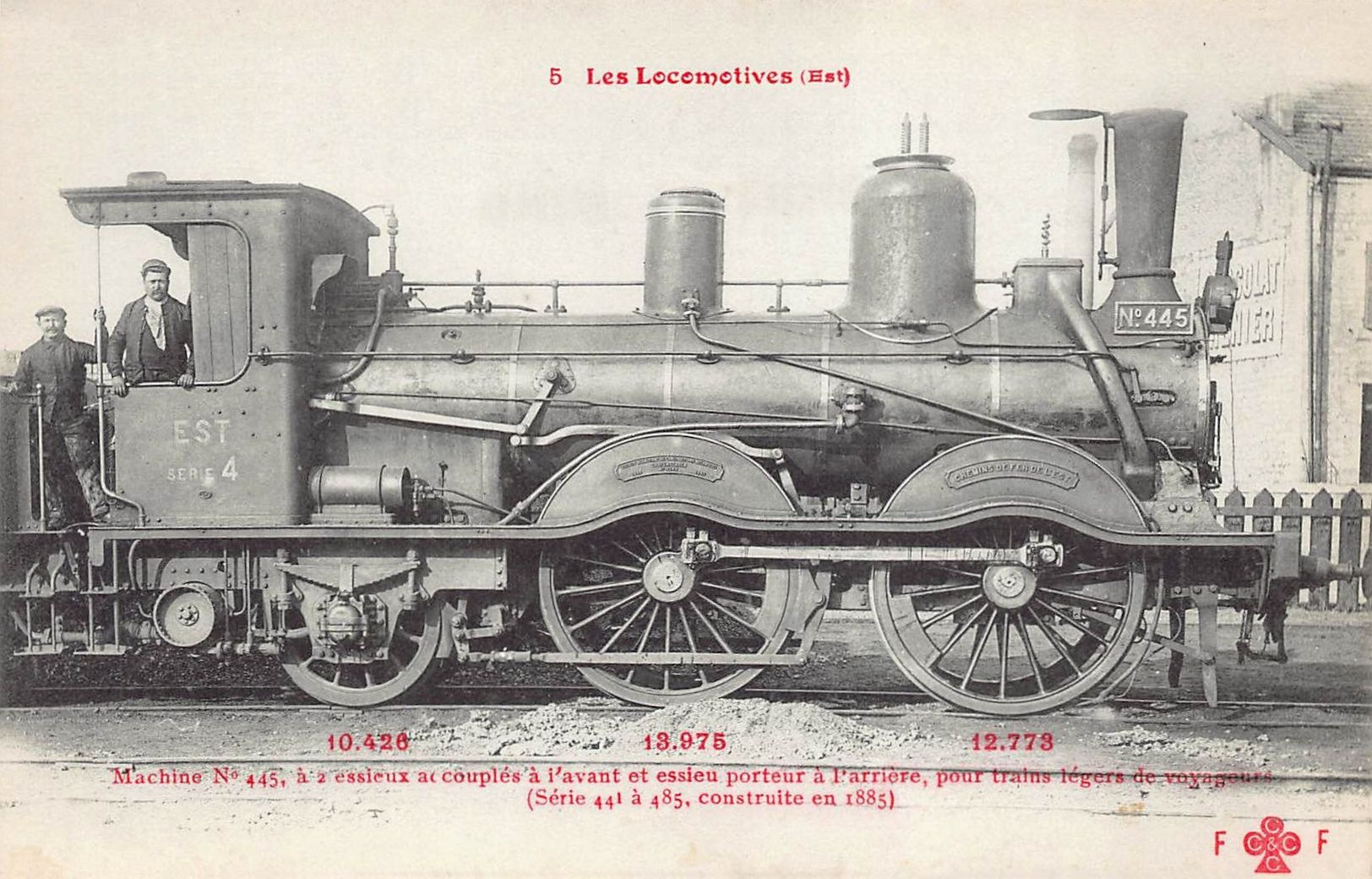
Type and origin
- Power type: Steam
- Designer: M. Regray
- Builder: SACM-Graffenstaden (25); SACM-Belfort (20)
- Build date: 1885
- Total produced: 45
Specifications
- Configuration
  - Whyte: 0-4-2
  - UIC: B1 n2
- Gauge: 1,435 mm (4 ft 8 1/2 in)
- Driver dia.: 1,840 mm (6 ft 1/2 in) (other sources: 1,820 or 1,850 mm (5 ft 11 5/8 in or 6 ft 7/8 in))
- Trailing dia.: 1,220 mm (4 ft 0 in)
- Length: 8.595 m (28 ft 2.4 in)
- Adhesive weight: 27.8 t (61,300 lb)
- Loco weight: 37.2 or 39.7 t (82,000 or 87,500 lb)
- Tender weight: 24.0 or 27.0 t (52,900 or 59,500 lb)
- Fuel capacity: 5.0 t (11,000 lb)
- Water cap.: 7.0 or 10.0 m^{3} (1,540 or 2,200 imp gal; 1,850 or 2,640 US gal)
- Firebox
  - Type: Crampton
  - Grate area: 1.71 m^{2} (18.4 sq ft)
- Boiler pressure: 10 kg/cm^{2} (0.981 MPa; 142 psi)
- Heating surface: 103.2 m^{2} (1,111 sq ft)
- Cylinders: Two, inside
- Cylinder size: 430 mm × 610 mm (16 15/16 in × 24 in)
- Valve gear: Stephenson
Performance figures
- Maximum speed: 90 km/h (56 mph)
- Power output: 620 CV (456 kW; 612 hp)
- Tractive effort: 6 t (13,200 lb)
Career
- Operators: Chemins de fer de l'Est; SNCF
- Power class: Est series 3 (later 4)
- Numbers: Est: 441 – 485; SNCF: 021 A 446, 452, 472, 474, 478
- Retired: 1926–1945

Est 441 to 485 was a class of 45 French 0-4-2 locomotives for mixed service, built in 1885 for the Chemins de fer de l'Est. They were the final development of the 0-4-2 locomotive in France.

== Construction history ==
The locomotives were built by Société Alsacienne de Constructions Mécaniques (SACM) at their works in Graffenstaden and Belfort.

Year	Est no.	SACM factory	SACM serial nos.	SNCF no.
1885	441–465	Graffenstaden	3536–3560	021 A 446, 452
1885	466–485	Belfort	3756–3775	021 A 472, 474, 478
