= Est 141.701 to 141.742 =

Est 141.701 – 141.742 SNCF 1-141.TC SNCF 3-141.TD.700
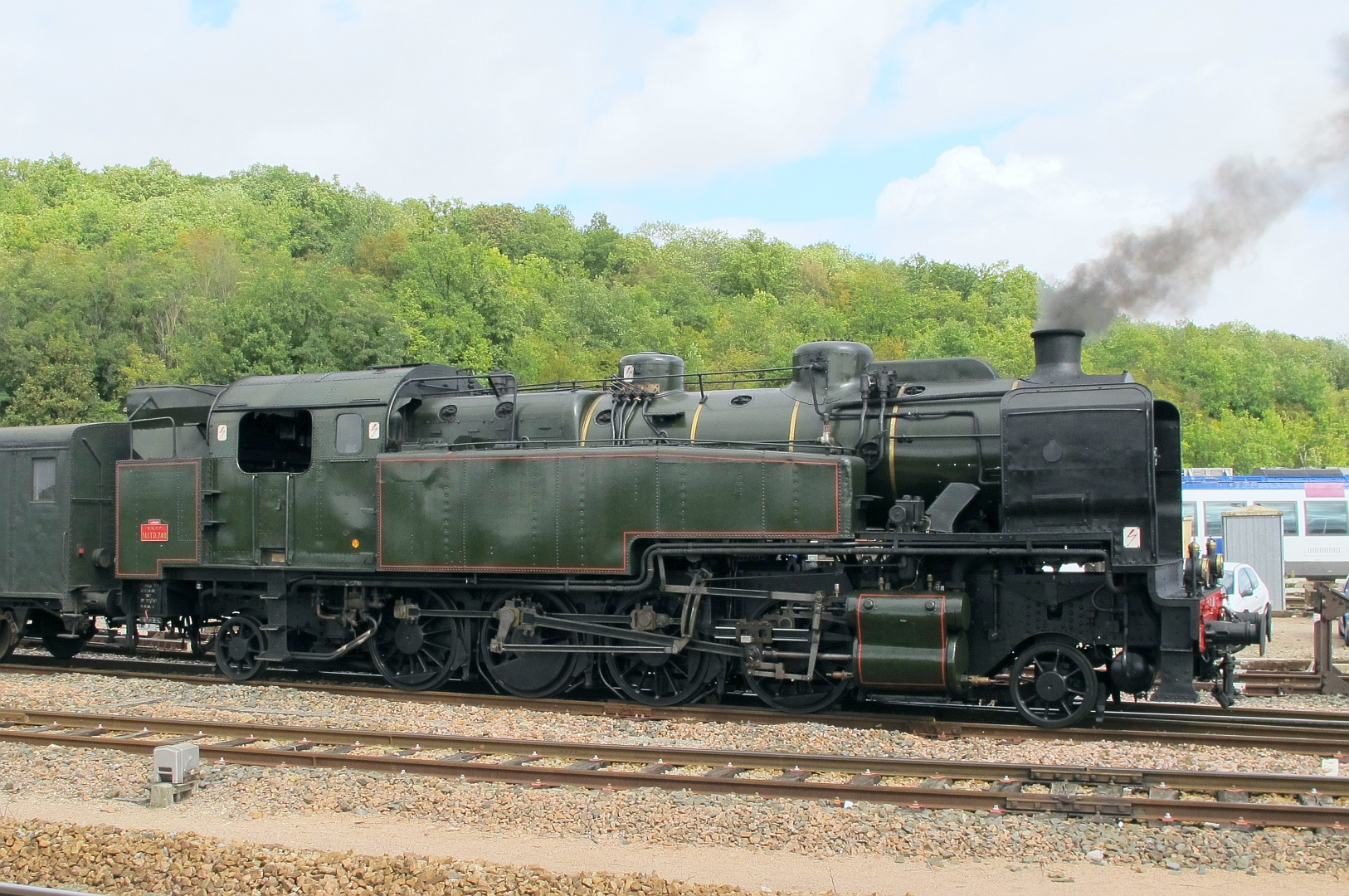
- 141.TD.740 at Longueville
Type and origin
- Power type: Steam
- Builder: Epernay Workshops (2); SFCM (40)
- Serial number: Epernay: 905–906; SFCM: 4184–4223
- Build date: 1930–1933
- Total produced: 42
Specifications
- Configuration
  - Whyte: 2-8-2T
  - UIC: 1′D1′ h3t
- Gauge: 1,435 mm (4 ft 8 1/2 in)
- Driver dia.: 1,420 mm (4 ft 7 7/8 in)
- Loco weight: 107.50 tonnes (105.80 long tons; 118.50 short tons)
- Fuel type: Coal
- Fuel capacity: 4 tonnes (3.9 long tons; 4.4 short tons)
- Water cap.: 13,000 litres (2,900 imp gal; 3,400 US gal)
- Firebox
  - Type: Belpaire
  - Grate area: 2.80 m^{2} (30.1 sq ft)
- Boiler pressure: New: 16.0 kg/cm^{2} (1.57 MPa; 228 psi); later: 14.0 kg/cm^{2} (1.37 MPa; 199 psi)
- Heating surface: 139.6 m^{2} (1,503 sq ft)
- Superheater
  - Type: DM3
  - Heating area: 34.76 m^{2} (374.2 sq ft)
- Cylinders: Three, simple
- Cylinder size: 470 mm × 660 mm (18 1/2 in × 26 in) or; 510 mm × 660 mm (20 1/16 in × 26 in)
Performance figures
- Power output: 1,650 hp (1,230 kW)
Career
- Operators: Chemins de fer de l'Est; SNCF
- Power class: Série 12s
- Numbers: Est: 141.701 – 141.742; SNCF: 1-141.TC.701 – 1-141.TC.742
- Scrapped: 1955–1967
- Disposition: 1 preserved, remainder scrapped

Est 141.701 to 141.742 were a class of 42 suburban Mikado (2-8-2T) tank locomotives of the Compagnie des chemins de fer de l'Est. The Est placed then in power class (série) 12s. At nationalisation in 1938, they passed to the SNCF who renumbered them 1-141.TC.701 to 1–141.TC.742.

== Origins ==
The Chemins de fer de l'Est needed more powerful locomotives to haul heavier suburban trains, and the introduction of heavier, safer, steel passenger cars meant the railway needed a locomotive capable of pulling 500 tonnes (490 long tons; 550 short tons) at 95 km/h (59 mph).

Two prototype locomotives were built in the company's Épernay Worksops in 1930; they were followed by a batch of forty locomotives from Société française de constructions mécaniques delivered between May 1932 and February 1933

== Description ==
The locomotives were three-cylinder, simple expansion type, with Belpaire fireboxes.

== Service history ==
The locomotives were used to pull suburban trains from Gare de l"Est until 1955, when electrification made them redundant. In May 1955, seven locomotives were transferred to the Batignolles depot on the Région Ouest where they were renumbered 3–141.TD.703, 709, 720, 736, 740, 741 and 742. They were then used on the same duties as the nearly identical 3–141.TD class locomotives, of which the État had bought forty as 42-101 to 42-140.

== Preservation ==
One locomotive has been preserved: 3–141.TD.740, ex 1–141.TC.740, née 141.740. Since February 1982, it has been in the custody of the Chemin de Fer Touristique Limousin Périgord, where it is used to pull special trains.

In October 1987, it was designated a Monument historique

== Models ==
The 141.700 have been reproduced in HO scale as an etched brass kit by LocoSet Loisir (Artmétal-LSL), and by Fulgurex in 2005.
