= Est 4003 to 4175 =

Type and origin
- Power type: Steam
- Builder: Épernay Works (88); Henschel & Sohn (20); Sächsische Maschinenfabrik (20); Fives-Lille (20); ANF (15)
- Build date: 1905–1914
- Total produced: 173
Specifications
- Configuration
  - Whyte: 2-8-0
  - UIC: 1′D n4v; 1′D h4v
- Gauge: 1,435 mm (4 ft 8 1/2 in)
- Leading dia.: 850 mm (2 ft 9 1/2 in)
- Driver dia.: 1,400 mm (4 ft 7 1/8 in)
- Adhesive weight: 65.0–65.8 tonnes (64.0–64.8 long tons; 71.7–72.5 short tons)
- Loco weight: 74.4 tonnes (73.2 long tons; 82.0 short tons)
- Tender weight: 4003–4090: 33.5 tonnes (33.0 long tons; 36.9 short tons); 4091–4175: 50.6 tonnes (49.8 long tons; 55.8 short tons)
- Fuel capacity: 4003–4090: 5 tonnes (4.9 long tons; 5.5 short tons); 4091–4175: 8 tonnes (7.9 long tons; 8.8 short tons)
- Water cap.: 4003–4090: 13,000 L (2,900 imp gal; 3,400 US gal); 4091–4175: 22,000 L (4,800 imp gal; 5,800 US gal)
- Firebox
  - Type: Belpaire
  - Grate area: 2.8 m^{2} (30 sq ft)
- Boiler pressure: 16 kg/cm^{2} (1.57 MPa; 228 psi)
- Heating surface: 4003–4070: 239 m^{2} (2,570 sq ft); 4071–4175: 153 m^{2} (1,650 sq ft)
- Superheater
  - Heating area: 4003–4070: Nil; 4071–4175: 37 m^{2} (400 sq ft)
- Cylinders: Four, compound: two high pressure inside, two low pressure outside
- High-pressure cylinder: 4003–4070: 390 mm × 650 mm (15 3/8 in × 25 9/16 in); 4071–4175: 415 mm × 650 mm (16 5/16 in × 25 9/16 in)
- Low-pressure cylinder: 4003–4070: 600 mm × 650 mm (23 5/8 in × 25 9/16 in); 4071–4175: 635 mm × 650 mm (25 in × 25 9/16 in)
Performance figures
- Maximum speed: 75 km/h (47 mph)
- Power output: 1,400 CV (1,030 kW; 1,380 hp)
Career
- Operators: Chemins de fer de l'Est; SNCF
- Power class: Est series 12 (saturated), 12s (superheated)
- Numbers: Est: 4403 – 4175; SNCF: 1-140.A.175
- Disposition: All scrapped

Est 4003 to 4175 was a class of 173 French compound 2-8-0 locomotives built in the early years of the 20th century for the Chemins de fer de l'Est. They were built to handle the increasing output of the steel industry in the Lorraine area.

== Origins ==
The locomotives were developments of the prototypes 4001 et 4002 which had been built for the Est by Société alsacienne de constructions mécaniques (SACM) in 1902. They were built in three batches, with the first two built by the Est's Épernay Works, and the third built by the various private contractors:

- The first series, 4003 to 4017, entered service in 1905–1906 and were identical to the prototypes 4001 and 4002.
- The second series, 4018 to 4070, entered service between 1907 and 1909 and only differed from the first batch due to alterations in the steam passages.
- The third and last series, 4071 to 4175, were delivered between 1911 and 1914 and were fitted with a 21-element Schmidt superheater.

Table of orders
Manufacturer	Works No.	Year	Est no.	SNCF no.
Épernay Works	510–524	1905	4003–4017	1-140.A.3 – 17
Épernay Works	555–570	1907	4008–4033	1-140.A.18 – 33
Épernay Works	511–587	1908	4034–4050	1-140.A.34 – 50
Épernay Works	606–625	1909	4051–4070	1-140.A.51 – 70
Épernay Works	671–680	1911	4071–4080	1-140.A.71 – 80
Épernay Works	681–690	1912	4081–4089	1-140.A.81 – 90
Henschel & Sohn	10635–10654	1911	4091–4110	1-140.A.91 – 110
Sächsische Maschinenfabrik	3505–3524	1911	4111–4130	1-140.A.111 – 130
Fives-Lille	3939–3968	1913	4131–4160	1-140.A.131 – 160
ANF	106–120	1914	4161–4175	1-140.A.161 – 175

== Description ==
The Consolidations were four-cylinder compound locomotives with Walschaerts valve gear. They were provided with a Belpaire firebox, Adams piston valves, and an Est-type horizontal regulator.

== Tenders ==
Originally these were two-axle tenders which held 13,000 litres (2,900 imp gal; 3,400 US gal) of water and 5 tonnes (4.9 long tons; 5.5 short tons) of coal; they had a gross weight in working order of 33.5 tonnes (33.0 long tons; 36.9 short tons). The 4091 to 4175 were equipped from new with three-axle tenders with a capacity of 22,000 litres (4,800 imp gal; 5,800 US gal) of water and 8 tonnes (7.9 long tons; 8.8 short tons) of coal; weight in working order was 50.6 tonnes (49.8 long tons; 55.8 short tons). These tenders were gradually assigned to the earlier locomotives.

== Usage and services ==
They became the Est's standard heavy 2-8-0 freight locomotive and were designed to haul heavy trains. They were allocated to many of the depots in Eastern France, like Nancy, Bar-le-Duc, Reims, Troyes, Saint-Dizier, Vesoul, Belfort, Châlons, and others. On an easy grade, the superheated locomotives were able to move a 1,200-to-1,500-tonne (1,180-to-1,480-long-ton; 1,320-to-1,650-short-ton) train at 40 to 45 km/h (25 to 28 mph), with peaks of 50 km/h (31 mph) possible. They could pull a 340 tonnes (330 long tons; 370 short tons) train at 20 km/h (12 mph) up a 20.0 to 22.5 per mille (2.00 to 2.25 percent / 1 in 50 to 1 in 44.4) grade.

All were still in service at nationalisation, and they were renumbered by the SNCF as 1-140.A.3 to 1-140.A.175.

Between 1932 and 1946 several were rebuilt with larger steam passages, a 6-jet exhaust system and smoke deflectors. These "Chapelonised" locomotives were reclassified from A to C by the SNCF.

They became the Est's standard heavy 2-8-0 freight locomotive Being a standard Est locomotive class, they stayed in service until they were replaced by the SNCF 141R class locomotives during the period 1948–1951. All were withdrawn by 1954 and none were preserved.

== Characteristics ==
- Overall length (loco only): 11.37 m (37 ft 3 3/4 in)
- Maximum theoretical tractive effort: 222 kN (50,000 lbf) (4003 – 4070), 251 kN (56,000 lbf) (4071 – 4175)
- Maximum practical tractive effort: 195 kN (44,000 lbf)

=== Tender ===
- Length of tender: 7.633 m (25 ft 1/2 in) (4091 – 4175)
- Length of loco and tender: 19.003 m (62 ft 4 1/4 in) (4091 – 4175)
