= Anciens Établissements Cail =

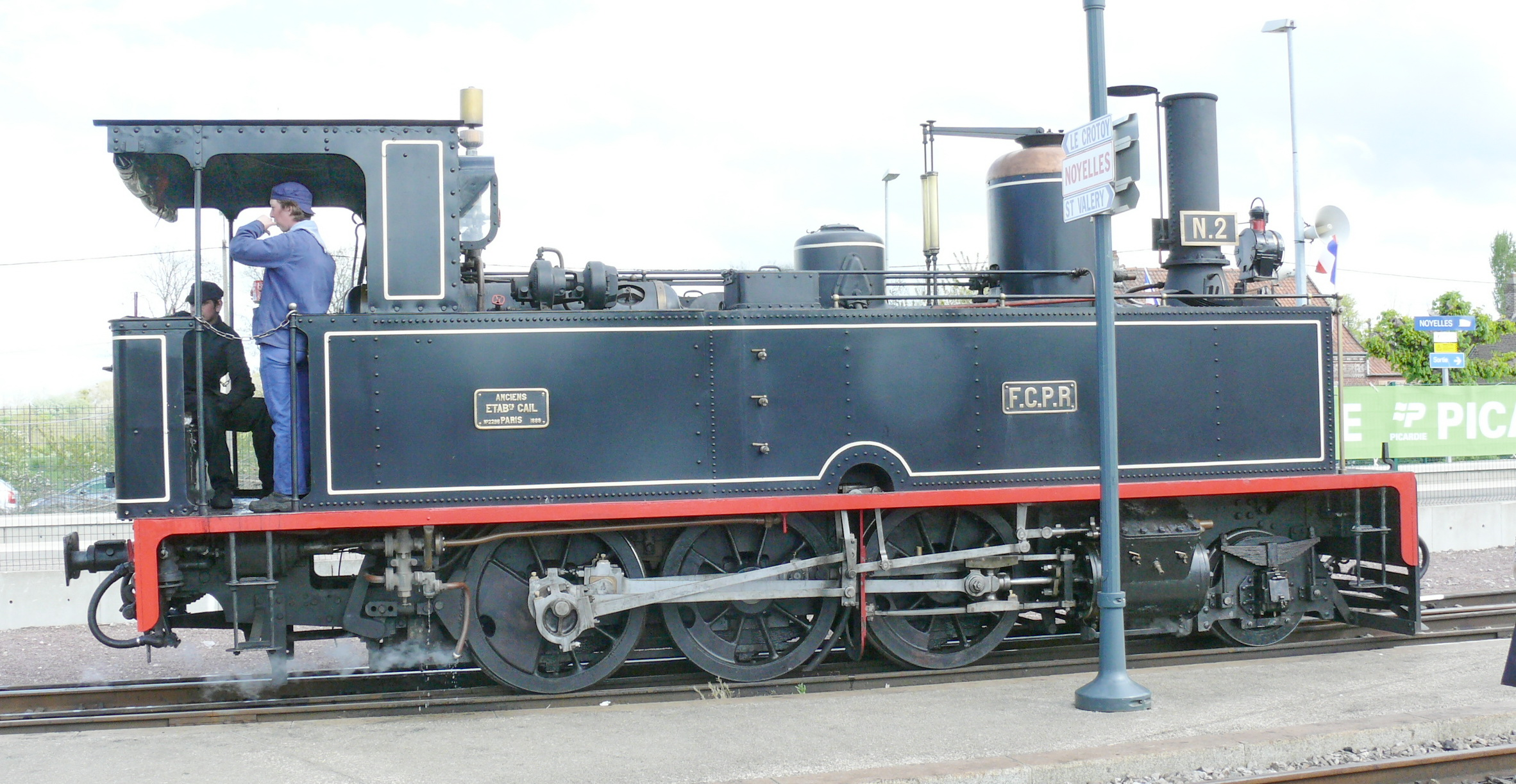
Locomotive initially sold by Cail to Panama Railways and preserved at Baie de Somme Railway in France

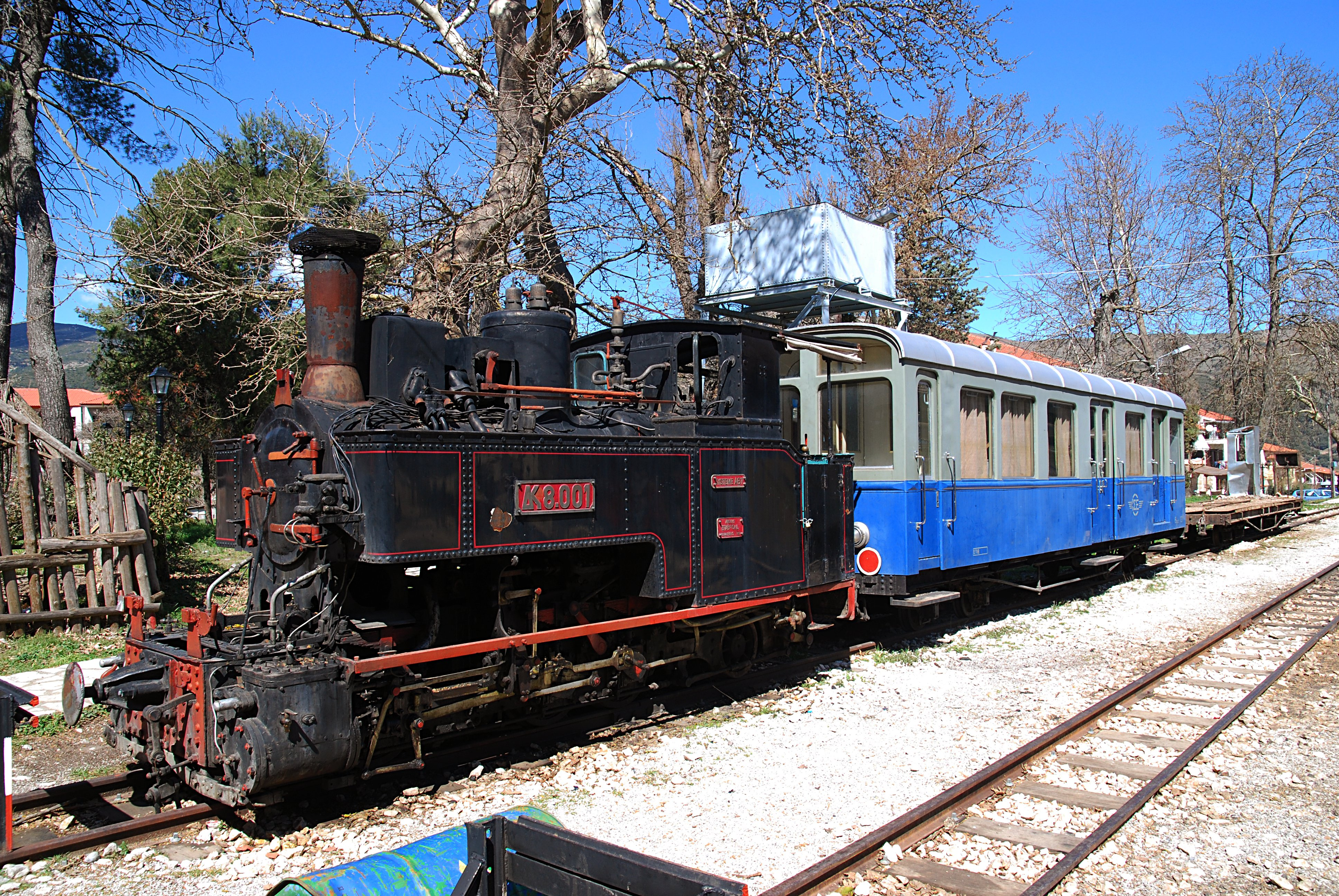
Locomotive sold by Cail to Greece

The Société Anonyme des Anciens Établissements Cail was established in 1883 with a capital of 20,000 francs. Several banks took part in its creation: the Crédit lyonnais, the Banque de Paris et des Pays-Bas and the Comptoir national d'Escompte de Paris. It succeeded the Société J. F. Cail & Cie, then in liquidation, which manufactured locomotives (2,360 between 1845 and 1889 including the famous Crampton) and also bridges (such as the Pont d'Arcole), the lift on the third floor of the Eiffel Tower, the Bouffes-du-Nord Theatre and the metal frame of the Gare du Musée d'Orsay. It was replaced by the Société française de constructions mécaniques in 1898.

On 9 January 1890, a new company was formed from Anciens Établissements Cail, with a capital reduced to 10 million francs divided into 20,000 shares of 500 francs. Its head office was at 16 rue de Grenelle, Paris and it employed 600 workers.

== Production ==
Production took place in Paris at Grenelle on the bank of the Seine and at Denain in the North.

== Material produced ==
Artillery material, cables, torpedo boats, railway material, sugar factory.

== Links ==
- List of Chemins de Fer de l'État locomotives
- List of Chemins de Fer du Nord locomotives
- List of Chemins de fer de l'Est locomotives
