= Société J. F. Cail & Cie =

J.F. Cail & Cie
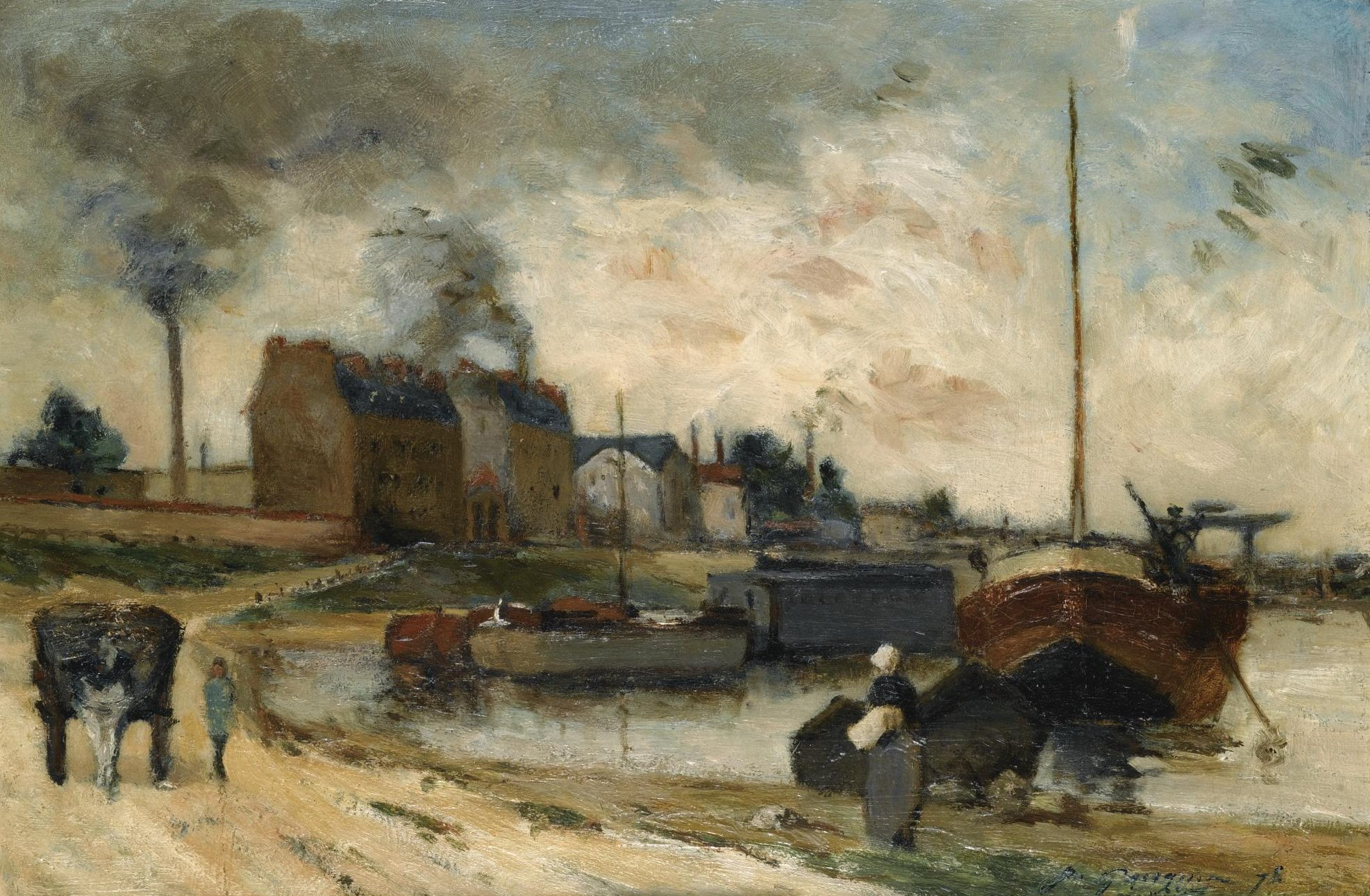
- Factory of J.F Cail and the quay of Grenelle by Gauguin in 1875
- Industry: machines, rolling stock, bridges, sugar mills
- Founded: 6 June 1850
- Founder: Jean-François Cail
- Defunct: 1883
- Headquarters: Paris

The Société J.F Cail & Cie was founded in Paris on 6 June 1850 by Jean-François Cail (1804-1871). It was a French industrial company during the Second French Empire, whose activity was principally in sugar mills, railway locomotives and metal bridges.

== History ==
The new company succeeded the Société Ch.Derosne et Cail, which was in difficulty following the French Revolution of 1848.

The headquarters of the enterprise and the factories were in the Chaillot district at 46 Quai de Billy (now the Avenue de New York). The business capital comprised 7 million Francs, making it the largest industrial enterprise in Paris. It had a factory for locomotives and a design office at its headquarters in Chaillot. In the Grenelle district, on the other side of the Seine, and in Denain there were facilities for Forges, Casting (metalworking) and Metal fabrication that made the company self-sufficient for these demands. Other factories were in Valenciennes, Douai and Bruxelles.

The factory in Chaillot had almost 1,000 employees. It was destroyed by fire in the night of 24–25 December 1865. It was not rebuilt, and its activities were transferred to the Grenelle factory.

In September 1861, the Société J. F. Cail & Cie. started a joint venture with the newly founded company Société Parent, Schaken, Caillet et Cie. Two months later this cooperation took the name Participation JF Cail, Parent, Schaken, Houel et Caillet, Paris et Fives-Lille (In 1865 Parent, Schaken, Caillet et Cie became the Compagnie de Fives-Lille). This joint venture lasted until January 1870.

Back on its own the Société J.F Cail was placed in liquidation in 1870.

A new company Nouvelle Société J.F Cail succeeded. The Société J.F Cail & Cie disappeared in 1883.

It was replaced by the Société Anonyme des Anciens Établissements Cail, which had its own successors.

== Activities ==
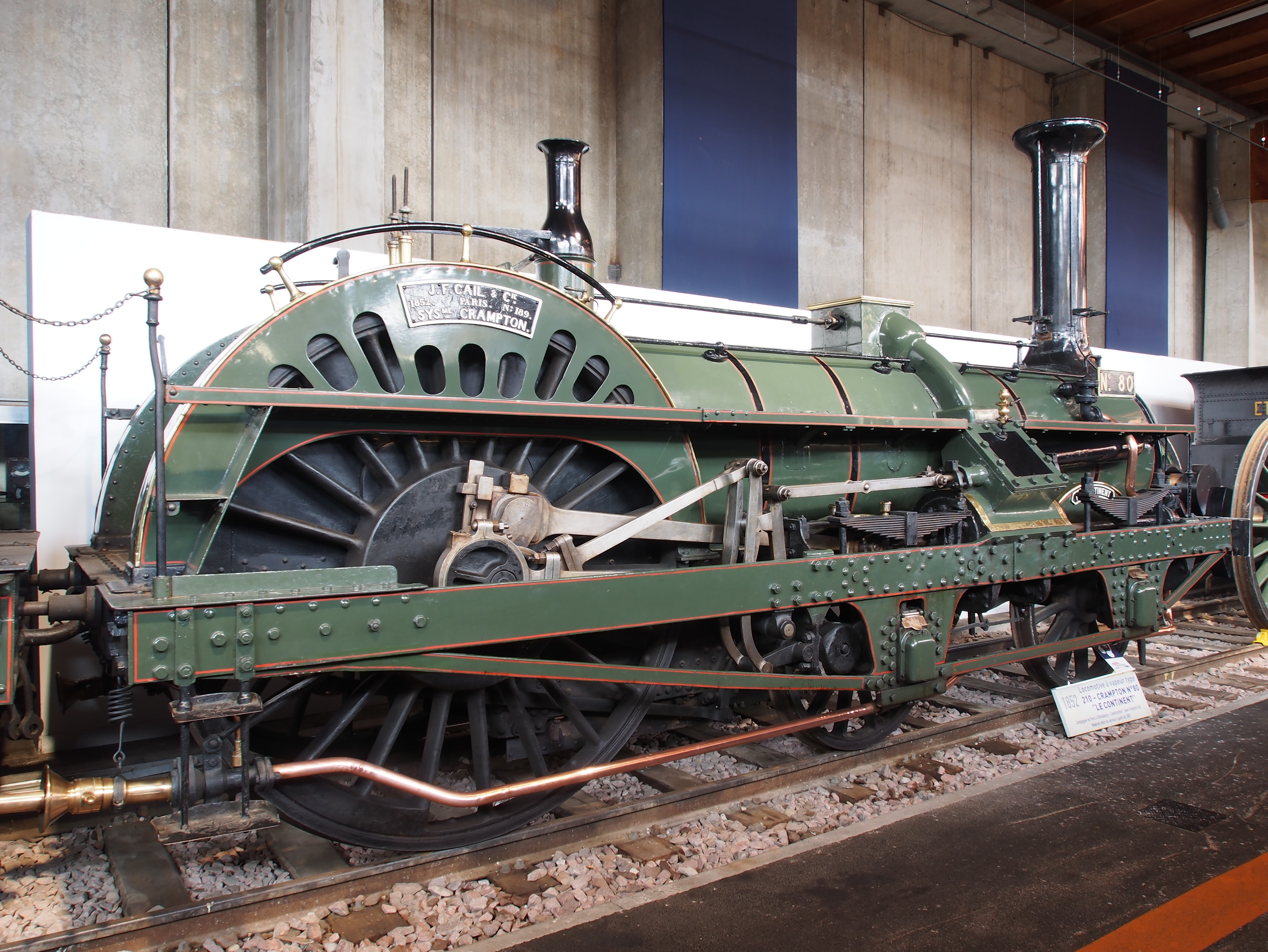
Locomotive 4-2-0 type No 80 built in 1852 by JF Cail & Cie for the Paris-Strasbourg Railway.

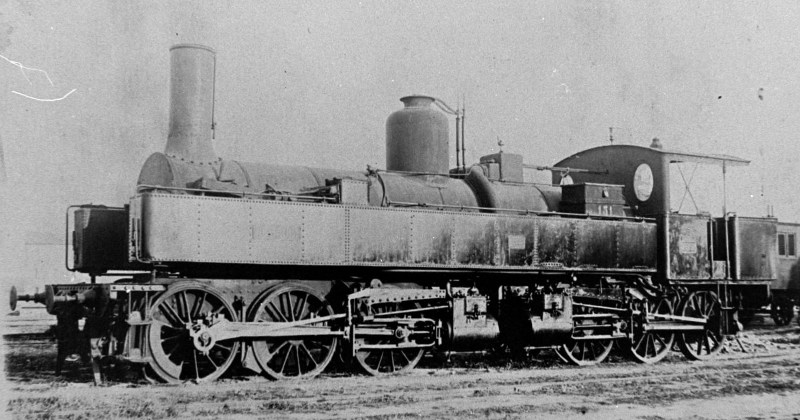
Locomotive M-151, 060-060T type (Meyer System) of the chemins de fer de l'Hérault in 1872

=== Sugar mills ===
In 1853 the company founded an annex in Bruxelles for producing machines under the name J.F. Cail, Halot et Cie. In turn this factory made a joint venture with Van Vlissingen en Dudok van Heel in Amsterdam under the name Van Vlissingen, van Heel, Derosne et Cail. This was focused on creating machines for the sugar industry.

=== Locomotives ===
The predecessor of Cail & Cie had acquired a license for producing Crampton locomotives. In the end the French Revolution of 1848 practically put an end to this production. The new company Cail & Cie then resumed production. From 1852 till 1857 it built 72 of these locomotives for regional French railroads. After 1857 the slump in internal demand was compensated by growing exports. At one time the company exported 57% of its locomotive production. In 1857 it exported locomotives to Spain and Russia.

From 1866-1870 the company produced about 90 locomotives for the Chemins de Fer du Nord. It also build dozens of locomotives for other regional railroads in France. However, in general the market for locomotives declined, and competition was fierce. The Franco-Prussian War would become a turning point after which production further declined.

=== Bridges ===
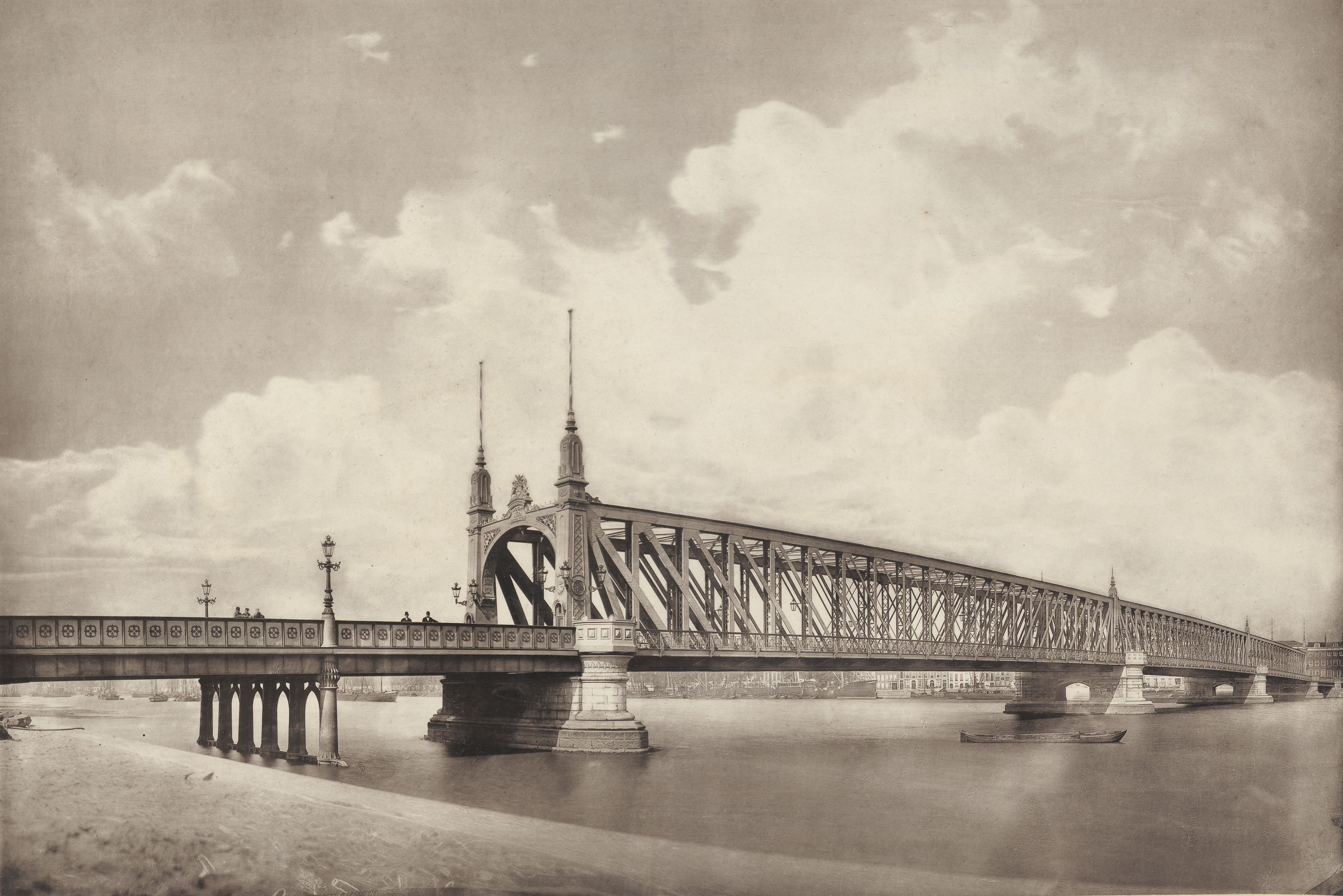
The old Willemsbrug over the Meuse in Rotterdam opened in 1878

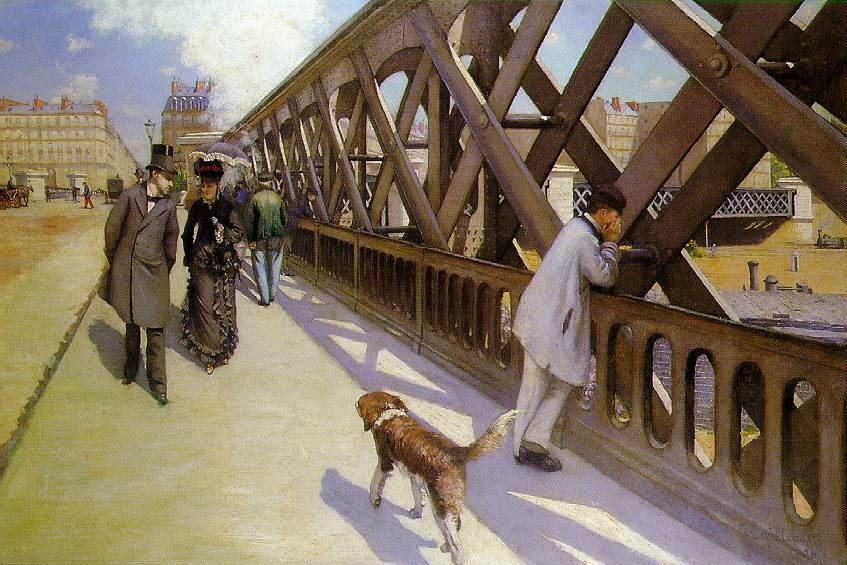
The Pont de l'Europe by Caillebotte

The first bridge built by J.F Cail & Cie was the Pont d'Arcole built in 1855 in Paris. It has a span of 80 m and was remarkable for being made of Iron instead of Cast iron. From October 1857 till July 1859 the company then built the iron bridge over the Allier in Moulins, Allier. Next came the bridges for the line from Lausanne to Fribourg. In the 1860s the factory for iron bridges in Grenelle occupied 1.8 hectares, and had 500 employees.

In the 1860s the joint venture between J.F. Cail and Fives-Lille (cf above) was also effective in bridge building. In 1864 it built the Viaduc de Busseau of 56.5 m height. In 1866 the joint venture finished the Pont de l'Europe made of Structural channels and sheet metal. In 1868-1869 it built the Viaduc du Belon and the Viaduc de la Bouille for the railroad from Gannat to Commentry. The joint venture also built part of the main building of the Exposition Universelle (1867)

Back on its own feet J.F. Cail company finished the Willemsbrug over the Meuse in Rotterdam in 1878.

== In Culture ==
The factory of J.F Cail on the quay of Grenelle was painted by Gauguin in 1875. The Pont de l'Europe, was immortalized by Gustave Caillebotte in 1876.

== Links ==
- List of Existing Locomotives
- List of Chemins de Fer de l'État locomotives
- List of Chemins de Fer du Nord locomotives
- List of Chemins de fer de l'Est locomotives
