= André Koechlin =

French industrialist

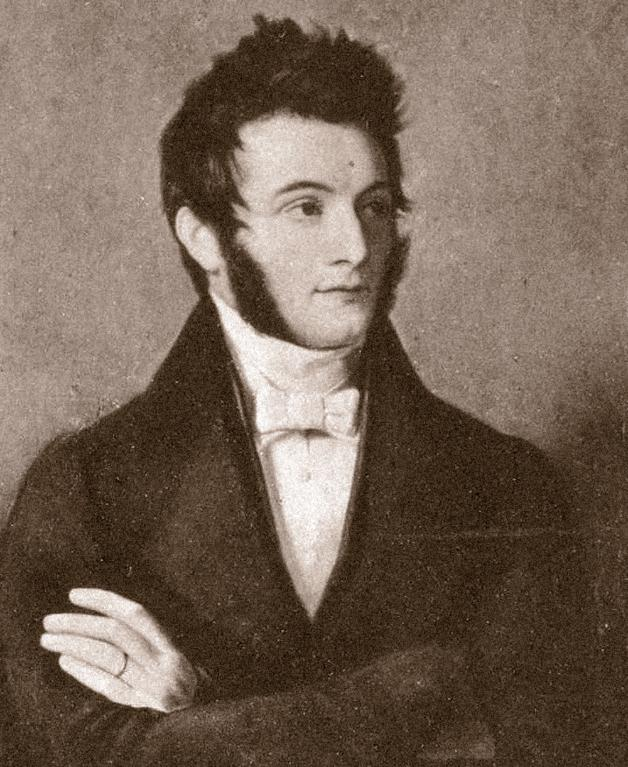
Portrait of André Koechlin by Claude-Marie Dubufe

André Koechlin (1789–1875) was a French industrialist and the railroad equipment maker from the Koechlin family.

== Life ==
André Koechlin was born in France to the Koechlin family, where he was the grandson of Samuel Koechlin, son-in-law of Daniel Dollfus-Mieg, head of the Dollfus-Mieg textile company and the first cousin once removed of structural engineer, Maurice Koechlin, who is an ancestor of actress Kalki Koechlin. Under his lead, between 1818 and 1826, the company became the leading textile company of Mulhouse. Turning in 1826 to the building of machinery for the textile industry, Koechlin became knowledgeable in the fabrication of steam machines and started making railroad equipment. The firm prospered and in 1839 already employed 1,800 people. By 1842, they were the largest French locomotive maker, having built 22 of them by then. This rose rapidly, and in 1857 alone, they made 91 locomotives. They stayed one of the six large French locomotive constructors until the merger with Elsässische Maschinenbau-Gesellschaft Grafenstaden in 1872, when the company became Société Alsacienne de Constructions Mécaniques.

André Koechlin was mayor of Mulhouse from 1830 until 1843, and was elected a deputy in 1830, 1831, 1841 and 1846. He became a Knight in the Legion of Honour in 1836.
