= Chemins de fer de l'Est =

French railway company

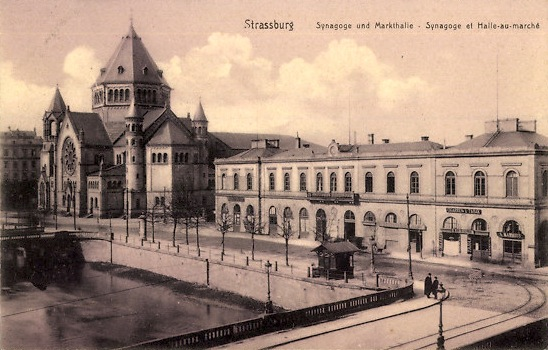
An old railway station of the Compagnie des chemins de fer de l'Est in Strasbourg (right) from a 1900 postcard. The German text translates to Synagogue and Market Hall.

The Compagnie des chemins de fer de l'Est (French pronunciation: [kɔ̃paɲi de ʃəmɛ̃ də fɛʁ də lɛst], lit. 'Eastern Railway Company', CF de l'Est), often referred to simply as the Est company, was an early French railway company. The company was formed in 1853 by the merger of Compagnie du chemin de fer de Paris à Strasbourg, operating the Paris-Strasbourg line, and Compagnie du chemin de fer de Montereau à Troyes. In 1938 it became part of the majority state-owned Société Nationale des Chemins de fer Français (SNCF).

== History ==
In 1854 the company absorbed the Compagnie du chemin de fer de Strasbourg à Bâle, in 1858 the Compagnie du chemin de fer de Mulhouse à Thann and in 1863 the railway network of the compagnie du chemin de fer des Ardennes.

== See also ==
- Alsace and Moselle railway network

== Bibliography ==
- Demeur, R. (1860). "Compagnie des chemins de fer de l'Est". Les chemins de fer français en 1860: Statuts des compagnies, notices historiques-situations financières (in French). pp. 92–115.
- Ministère des travaux publics, Recueil des lois et conventions relatives aux chemins de fer du Nord, de l'Est, d'Orléans, de Paris-Lyon-Méditerranée et du Midi: 1883 à 1910, Paris, Imprimerie Nationale (in French). 1911.
- Rigouard, Jean-Pierre (2006). Paris-Strasbourg, de la Compagnie de l'est au TGV, Mémoire en images (in French). Alan Sutton. ISBN 2849105503.
- Ellenberger, Marc (1975). La Compagnie des chemins de fer de l'Est et la guerre de 1914-1918. Bures-sur-Yvette: Ellenberger.
- Forthoffer, Joël (2010). "Le transport ferroviaire de denrées périssables en Alsace: l'exemple de la bière". Revue de l'histoire des chemins de fer de l'AHICF (41): 179–186. ISSN 0996-9403. The author reports on the transport of perishable goods by rail in Alsace in the 20th century. It traces the evolution of the market of la Compagnie des chemins de fer de l'Est in 1852 to la Reichsbahn Elsass Lothringen (1871-1918).
