= Kemanglen Sugar Factory =

Sugarcane factory in the Dutch East Indies

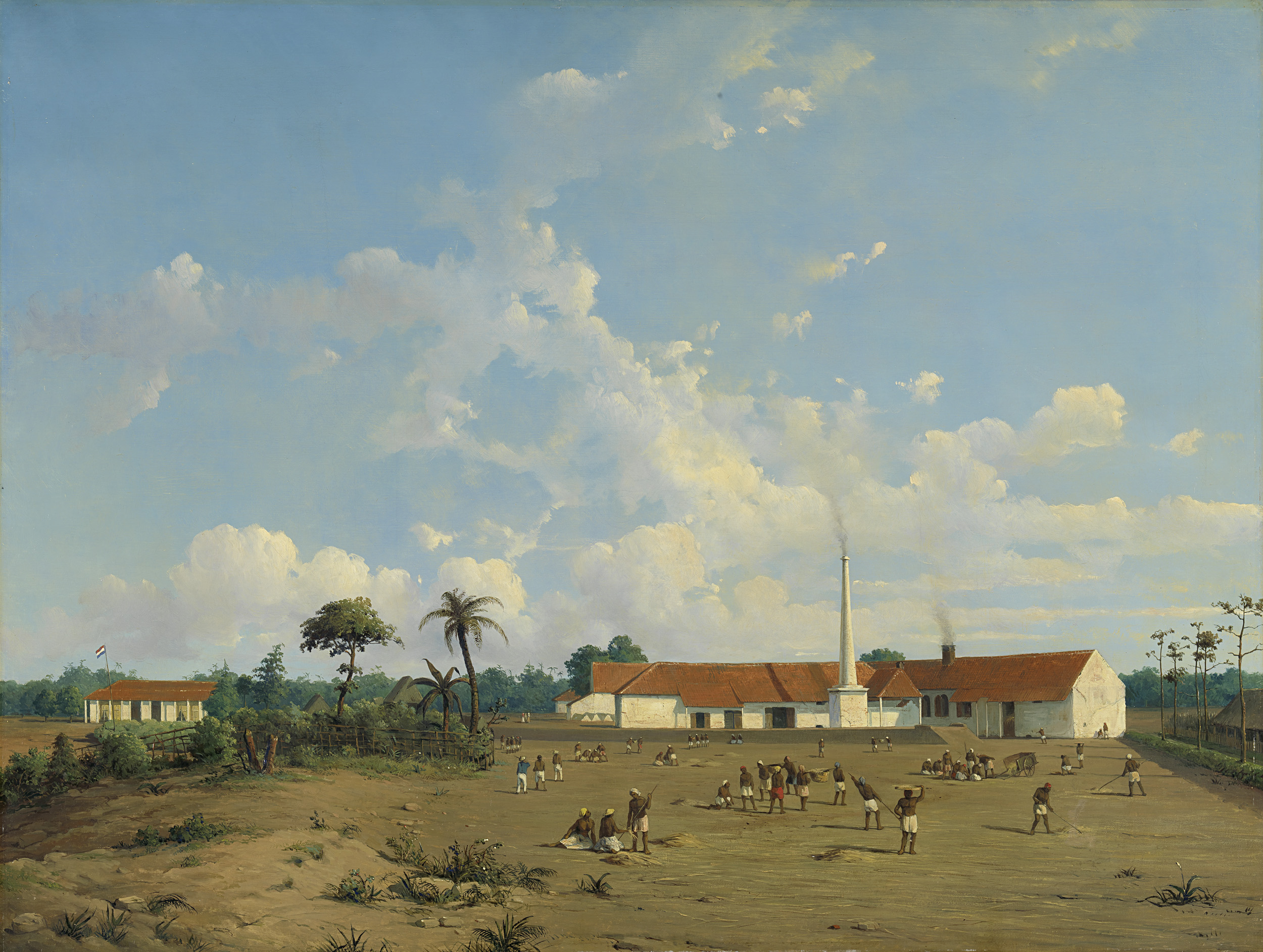
Kemanglen Sugar Factory in 1870-1875. Lithograph is based on a painting by Abraham Salm

Kemanglen Sugar Factory (Indonesian: Pabrik Gula Kemanglen; also known as Suikerfabriek Kemanglen) was one of the many sugarcane processing factories that stood in the Dutch East Indies. The Kemanglen Sugar Factory is located in Dukuh Kemanglen, Pakembaran, Slawi, Tegal, near Slawi Station.

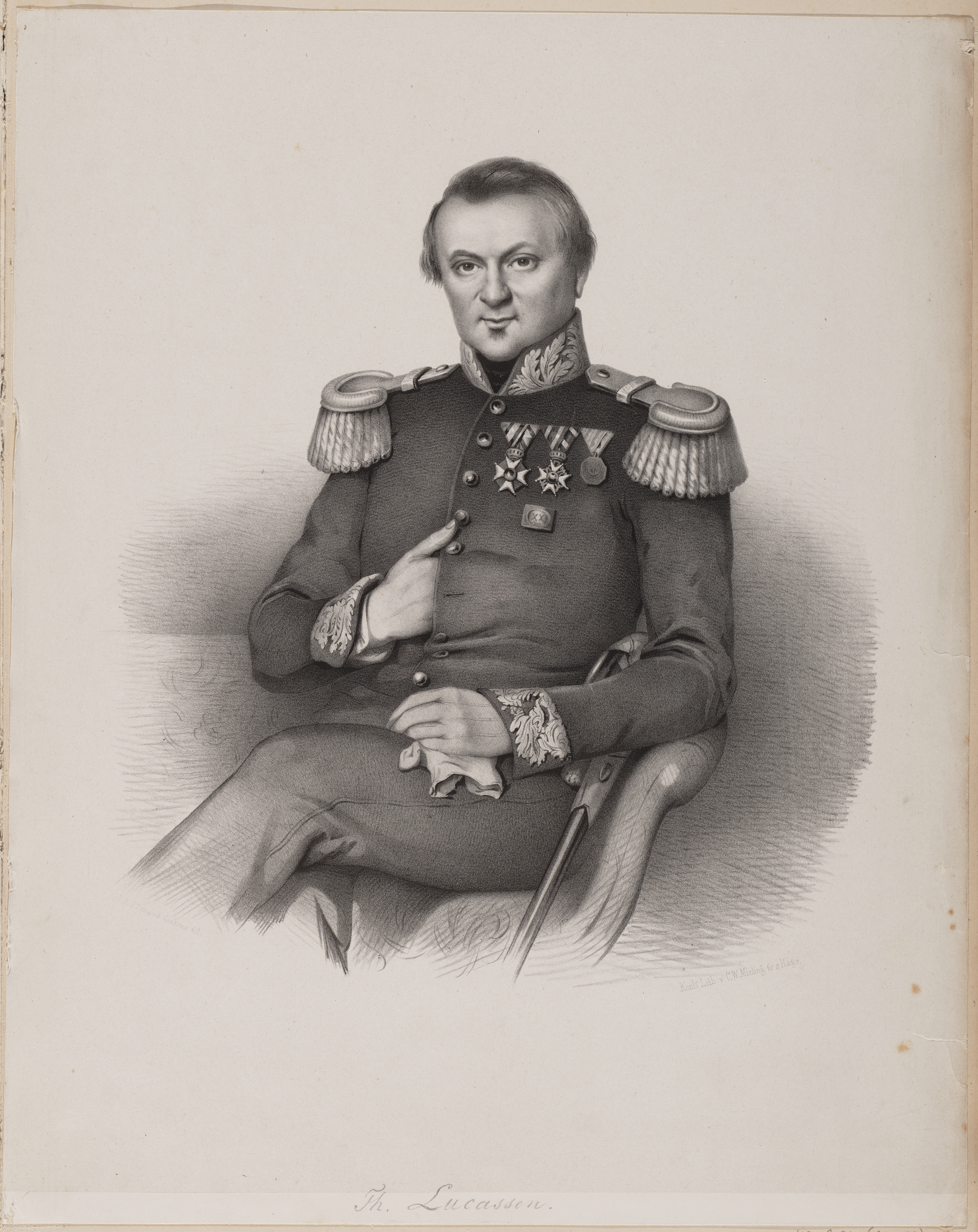
Colonel Theodore Lucassen (1792-1854), founder and owner of PG Kemanglen and PG Dukuhwringin

== History ==
The Kemanglen Sugar Factory was established by Lucassen and Hoevenaar with the sugar contract system. It was built in 1841 and completed in 1842.

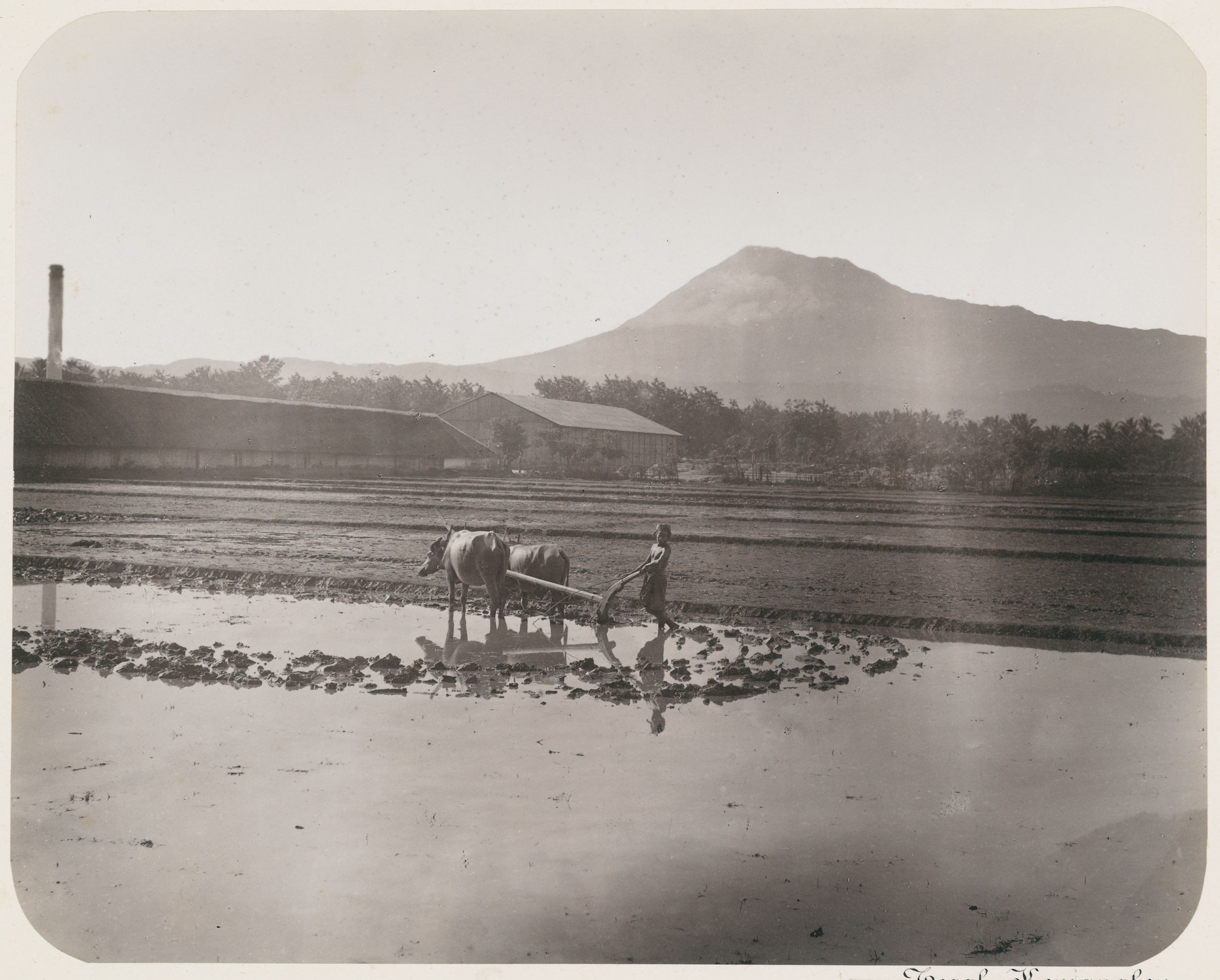
View of Mount Slamet and rice fields from behind the Kemanglen Sugar Factory in 1890.

In early March 1839, Lucassen and Holmberg, who were in the Netherlands at that time, carried a petition for Willem I of the Netherlands, requesting a sugar contract so they can build a 600 hectare sugar factory in Java, on the basis of their independent theoretical studies regarding modernizing sugar production. However, as their plan of collaborating to build the sugarcane company didn't go to fruition as neither of them had the necessary technical knowledge regarding processing sugar cane into sugar, they decided to build their own separate sugar factories. Lucassen chose to associate itself with Hoevenaar. To optimize processing capacity, they shifted their request from one plant to two, each receiving 400 hectares of land.

In 1840, the Minister of Colonies J.C Baud released a sugar contract system. Lucassen, with the help of Hoevenaar, received 120,000 guilders for machinery and 130,000 for factory construction. Holmberg, on the other hand, was only given 80,000 guilders.

After securing funds for the establishment of the factory, Lucassen and Holmberg visited the Hovenaar family in Paris. There, Lucassen and Holmberg worked together with Derosne et Cail, a French manufacturer, who had previously made industrial equipment in the Caribbean and United States. They also brought together young Scottish engineers to design the factory.

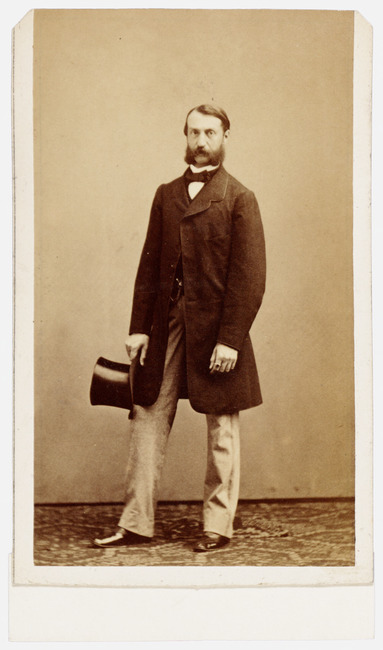
Gerardus Johannes Netscher (1822-1877), Engineer at Stoomwezen, Dutch East Indies, who later became the Director and Administrator of the Kemanglen and Dukuhwringin Sugar Factories.

After staying for a while in Paris, Lucassen, Holmberg, and Hoevenaar, along with some workers, set off to Java via ship. The ship they rode on also carried machinery and construction materials for the factory. After months of sailing and finally arriving in Java, they then headed to the Tegal area, where the land was a sugar contract system. Lucassen and Hoevenaar chose the Slawi area to build a sugar factory, while Holmberg himself built a sugar factory in the village of Ujungrusi.

In 1841, Lucassen and Hovenaar established the Kemanglen Sugar Factory, and in the same year, Holmberg established the Adiwerna Sugar Factory. In 1842, Lucassen then established the Dukuhwingin Sugar Factory, the same year as when the Jatibarang Sugar Factory was established.

Roger Knight noted that during 1841-1842, 2 factories with the most advanced technology were built in Kemanglen and Dukuhwringin. Both of these factories were equipped with steam engines imported from the French-Belgian steel company, Derosne et Cail, which had previously manufactured industrial machinery in the Caribbean and America. The owner of these two factories was a wealthy retired Dutch soldier known as Colonel Theodore Lucassen. It was Lucassen who deployed these young Scottish engineers to design a technologically advanced sugar factory at that time.

Hovenaar managed the Kemanglen Sugar Factory, and Nicholes Lucassen (son of Lucassen) managed the Dukuhwringin Sugar Factory. In 1843, both of the sugar factories that Lucassen owned produced sugar for the first time. The following year, Lucassen established houses for the employees of the sugar factories, that were built near the sugar factories.

The Kemanglen Sugar Factory ceased operations in 1942 when the Japanese occupation of the Dutch East Indies started. The main factory building was destroyed, and the machinery as well as steam locomotive itself was looted by the Japanese. The factory workers' houses were then used as a camp for Imperial Japanese Soldiers. The workers of the factory, most of whom where Dutch, were held captive by the Imperial Japanese Armed Forces in war detention camps until the Japanese surrendered to the Allies in 1945.

In July 1947, after Indonesia's independence, control of the Kemanglen Sugar Factory and the Dukuhwringin Sugar Factory were regained by the Dutch. They attempted to revive the two sugar factories. However, the companies ultimately proved unprofitable. In 1950, a shareholders' meeting decided to liquidate the two sugar factories, and this process was finally completed in 1956. In 1957, the Kemanglen Sugar Factory as well as the Dukuhwringin Sugar Factory were officially nationalized by the Indonesian government.
