= Franz Anton Cramer =

Franz Anton Cramer (born 1776 in Paderborn; died May 9, 1829 in Paderborn) was a German court apothecary in Paderborn. Cramer’sche Hofapotheke is the later Adlerapotheke at the Paderborn market. His generous support enabled Friedrich Sertürner to discover morphine. He is the great-grandfather of the writer Hermann Löns.

== Discovery of morphine ==
On 1 October 1799, Friedrich Sertürner began there an apprenticeship for four years. During this time he started his scientific work, which later became the basis for the discovery of morphine. In 1804, for the first time Friedrich Sertürner isolated morphine out of the watersoluble extract of opium in the Cramer’schen Hofapotheke.

== Literature ==
- Fritz Cramer: Stammliste Cramer-Paderborn. In: Westfälisches Familien-Archiv, Band 8/9 1926, S. 101–104 (Digitalisat)
