= Jean-François Derosne =

French pharmacist and chemist

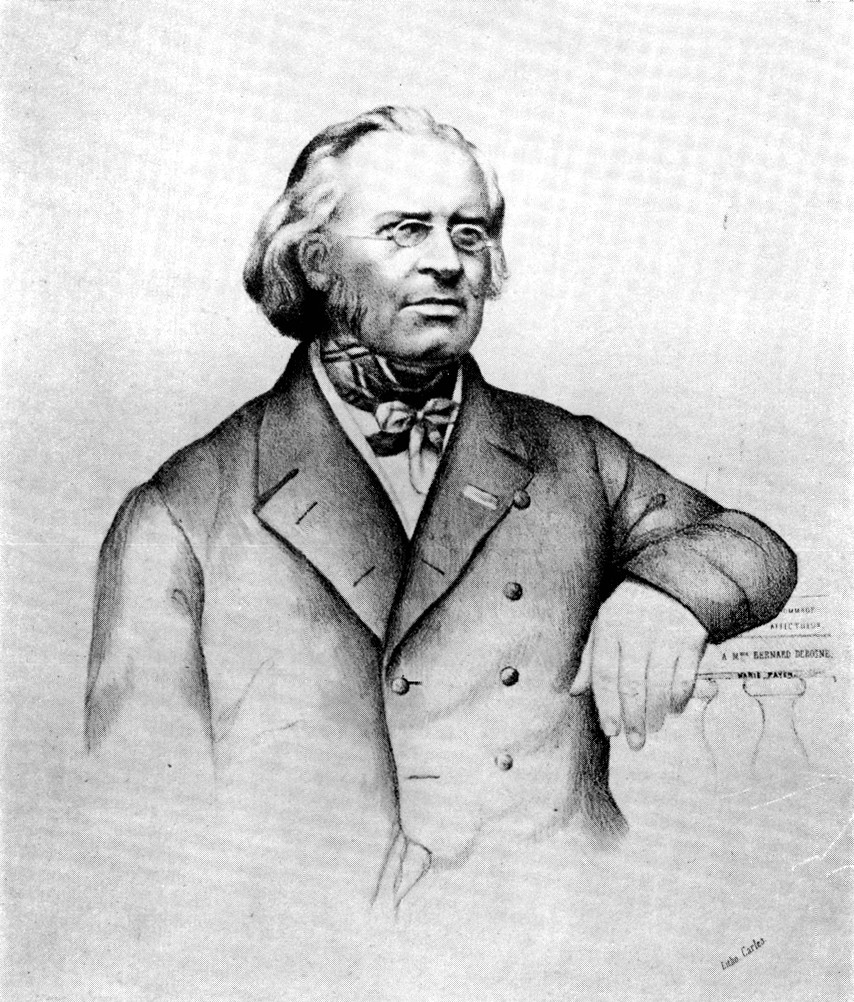

Jean-François Derosne (18 July 1774 – 16 September 1855) was a French pharmacist and chemist. Along with his brother Louis-Charles, he ran the family pharmacy in Paris while also conducting research. He is known for his extraction of noscapine from opium.

Derosne was born on rue Saint-Honoré, and from the age of 18, he worked in the pharmacy of his father, François Derosne (1743-1796), who was married to Anne Godefroy. He also attended courses run by Jean Darcet and Louis Nicolas Vauquelin at the School of Pharmacy run by the Society of Pharmacists of Paris. He matriculated in 1800 and, after passing his exams, he joined the family pharmacy. After the death of his mother in 1806, he became the sole owner of one of ten pharmacies in 1803 located on rue Saint-Honoré. Shortly after taking over, he had to handle a court case between his mother and Charles-Louis Cadet de Gassicourt. Cadet de Gassicourt and he were both involved in the Paris Pharmacy Society, where they appear to have worked without trouble. He collaborated with Martin Deschamps on intestinal worms in Vienna and examined the key ingredient in the root of Plumbago. Along with his brother, he studied the decomposition of copper acetate and the formation of acetic acid. He also took a patent on the bleaching of sugars along with his brother. His own major work was on an extract of opium in 1803 that he called the essential opium salt or narcotine, which is now called as noscapine. This was distilled from an aqueous extract of opium, and while it showed anti-tussive properties, it did not have a narcotic effect. The work was continued by Armand Séguin and ultimately by Friedrich Sertürner who was able to extract pure alkaloid.
