= Société Ch.Derosne et Cail =

The Société Ch.Derosne et Cail was a French enterprise (1836–1848), which built steam locomotives and sugar mills. It was replaced by the new Société J. F. Cail & Cie in 1848.

== History ==
The Société Ch.Derosne et Cail was created in Paris, on 4 March 1836, by Messieurs Charles Derosne and Jean-François Cail. It succeeded the "Atelier Ch.Derosne", founded in 1818.

The headquarters of the enterprise and the factory were situated in Paris, in the Chaillot district at 46 Quai de Billy (today 46 avenue de New York). A factory was also built in the rue des Batailles (avenue d'Iéna) also in Chaillot.

The Société Ch.Derosne et Cail disappeared in 1848, replaced by the new Société J. F. Cail & Cie.

== Production ==
Production consisted of steam-powered machinery for mills, exported around the world, and steam locomotives.

In 1844, the company Chemins de Fer du Nord ordered eight locomotives of the Crampton design from the Société Ch.Derosne et Cail.
