= Armand Séguin (painter) =

French painter (1869–1903)

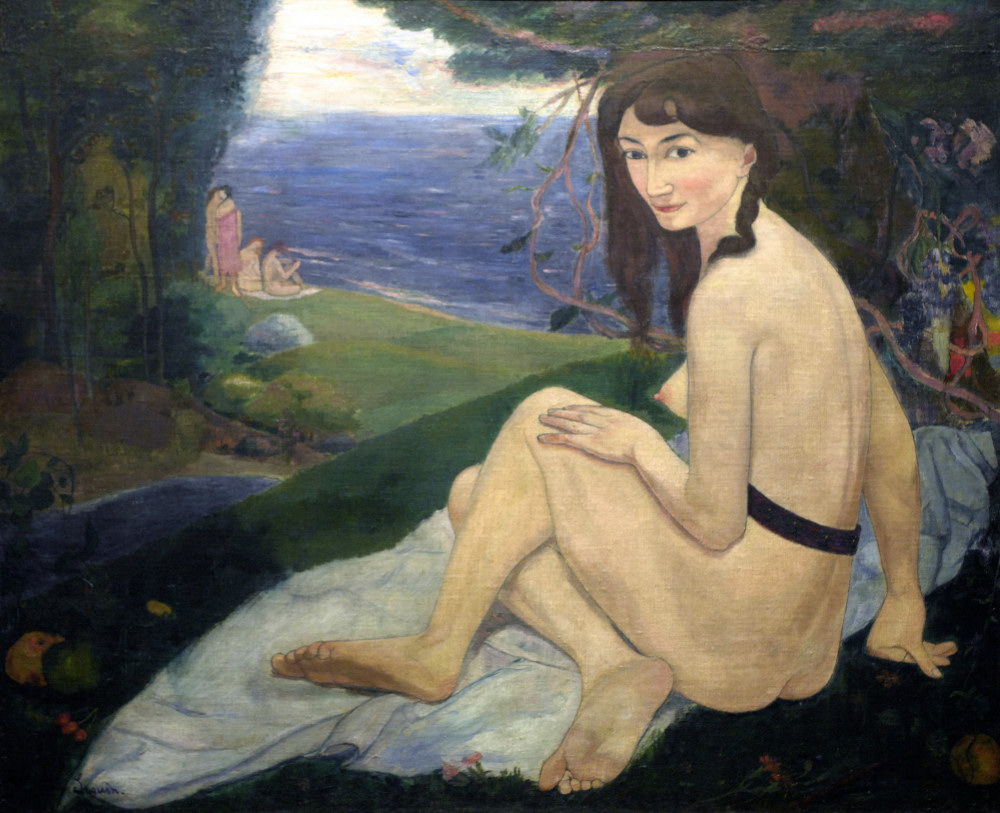
Armand Séguin: Nu de la comtesse d'Hauteroche (1896)

Armand Séguin (1869–1903) was a post-Impressionist French painter who is remembered for his involvement in the Pont-Aven School beginning in 1891. In 1892, he returned to Pont-Aven where he met Renoir and Émile Bernard. The following year, he associated with Paul Gauguin, who gave him lessons, and collaborated with Roderic O'Conor in producing etchings.

He died in Châteauneuf-du-Faou at the age of 34, a destitute alcoholic who was suffering from tuberculosis.

He was a grandson of chemist Armand Séguin.
