= Charles Derosne =

French chemist involved in the French industrial revolution

Louis-Charles Derosne
- Born: 23 January 1780; Paris, France
- Died: 21 September 1846 (aged 66)
- Spouse: Elisabeth O'Keeffe (m. 1803)
- Children: 2

Louis-Charles Derosne (23 January 1780 – 21 September 1846) was a French chemist and an inventor of industrial manufacturing machinery who was actively involved in the French industrial revolution.

== Biography ==
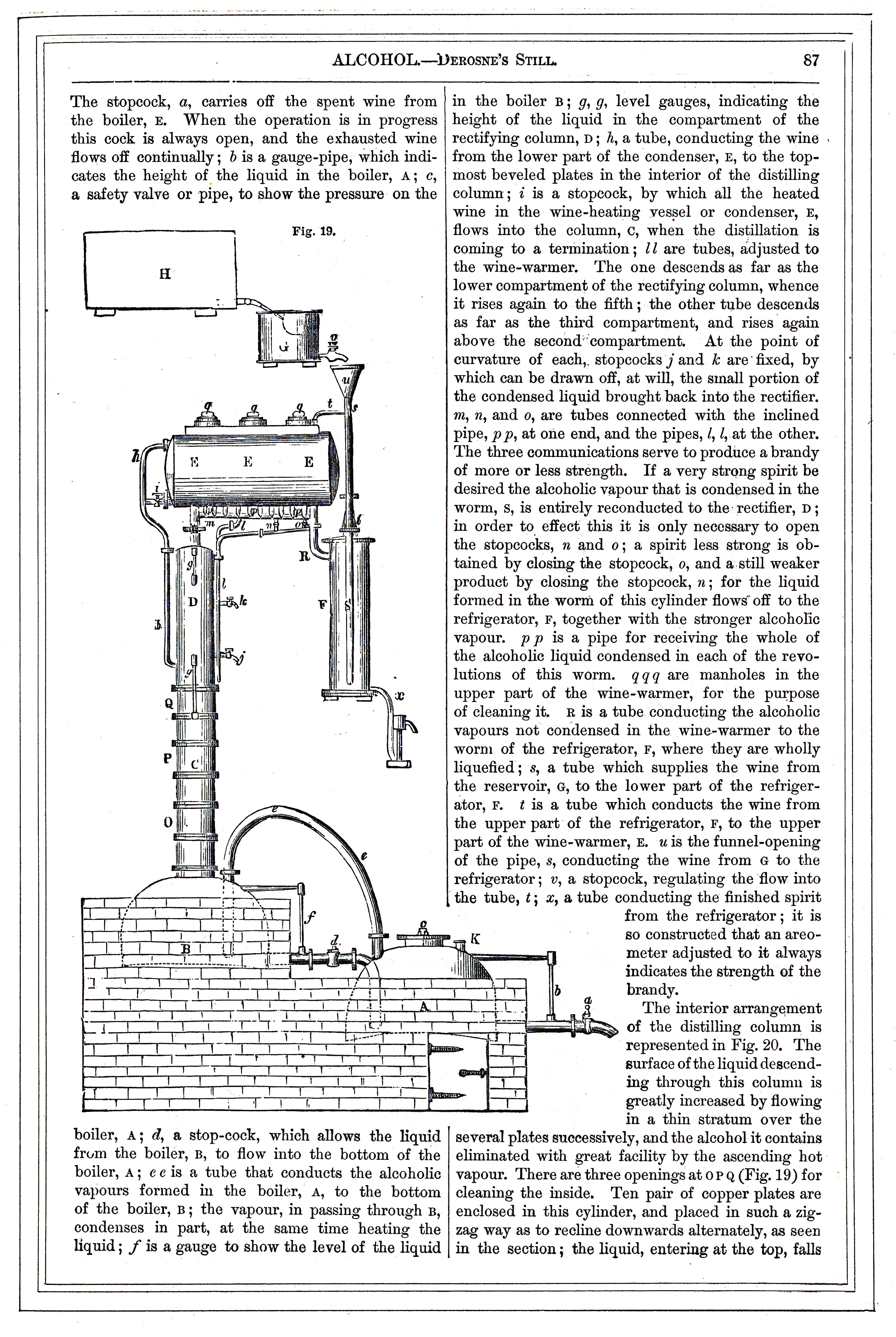
Derosne's still

Derosne was born in Paris where his father François belonged to a family of apothecaries who ran the Cadet-Derosne pharmacy on Rue St. Honoré. His godfather was Charles-Louis Cadet de Gassicourt. After the death of his father in 1796, the pharmacy was run by Charles's older brother Jean-François (1774–1855) who became famous for his analysis of opium in 1803. Charles refined the opioid extract named narcotine and now known to be a mixture of several alkaloids including noscapine.

Charles took an interest in analytical chemistry along with his brother and both became members of the Academy of Medicine in Paris, Jean-François in 1821 and Charles in 1823. Charles was also involved in innovating techniques for refining sugar, distillation and in industrial manufacturing. He began to refine beet sugar, and found ways to refine and manufacture sugar more efficiently. He also developed a continuous distillation still before partnering with Jean-François Cail to establish Société Ch.Derosne et Cail which produced industrial machinery.

Derosne married Elisabeth O'Keeffe from Ireland in 1803 and they had two daughters.
