= Paderborn =

Paderborn Patterbuorn / Paterboärn (Westphalian)
- City
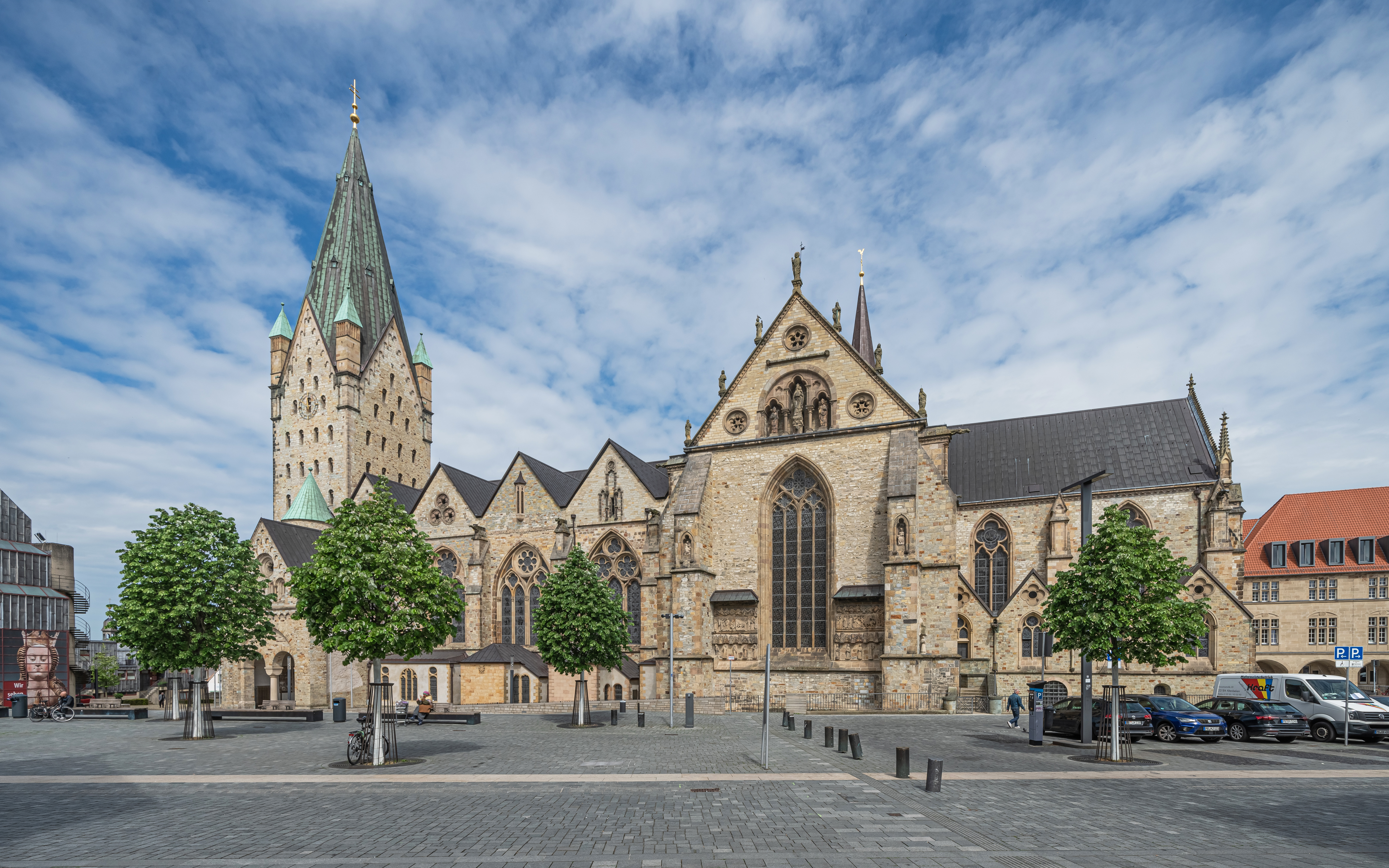
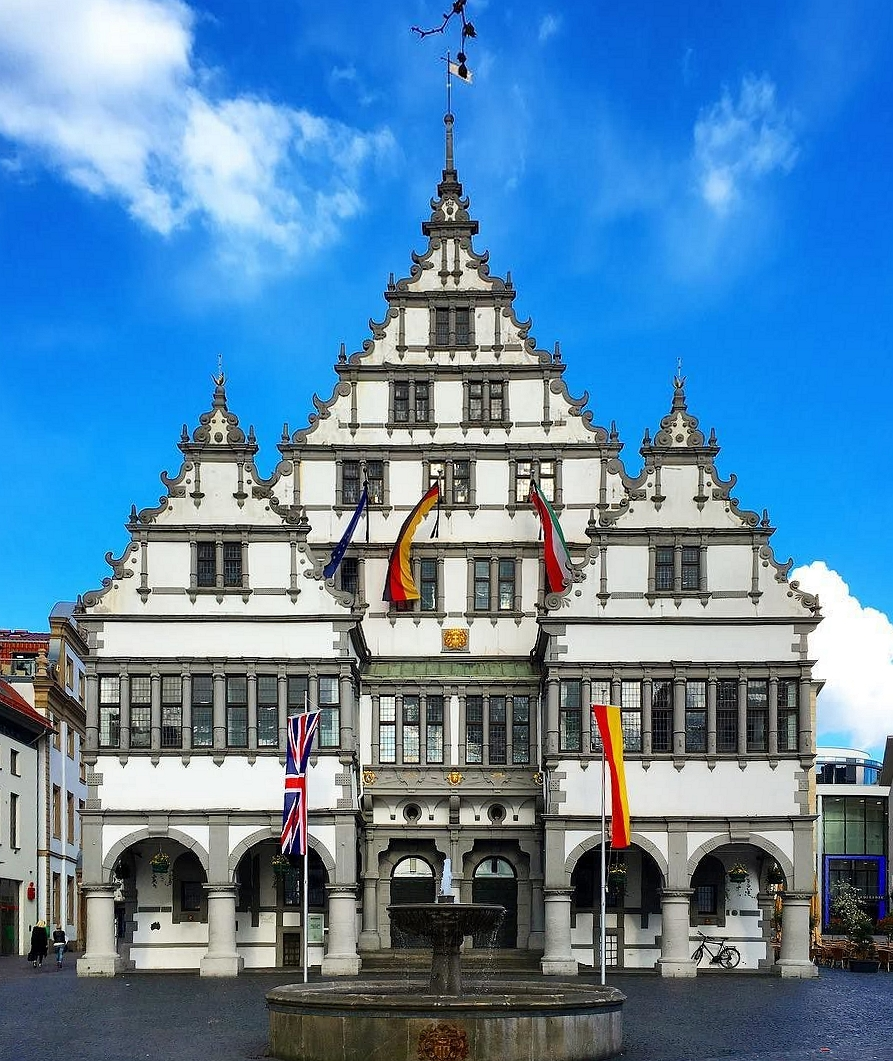
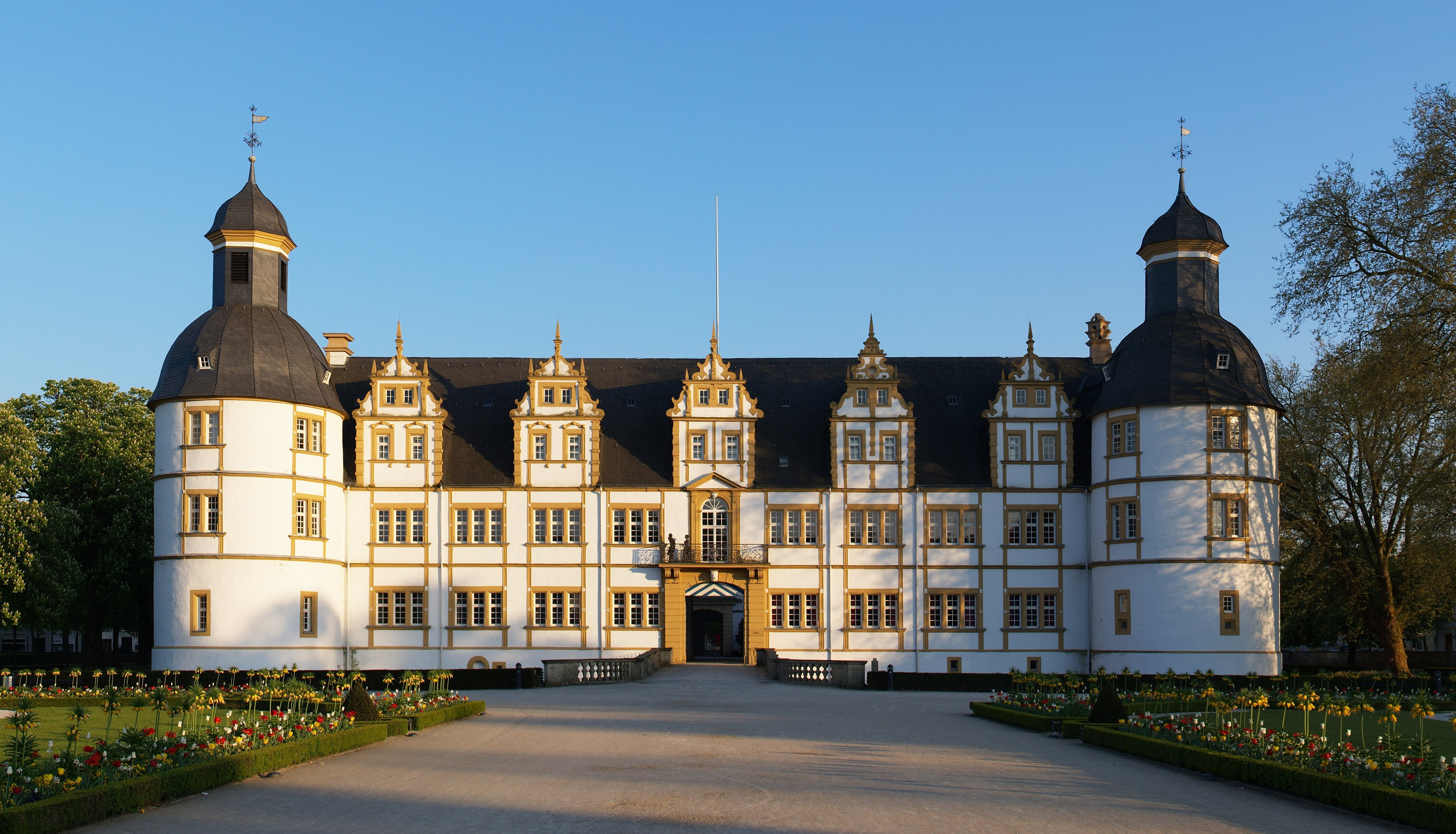
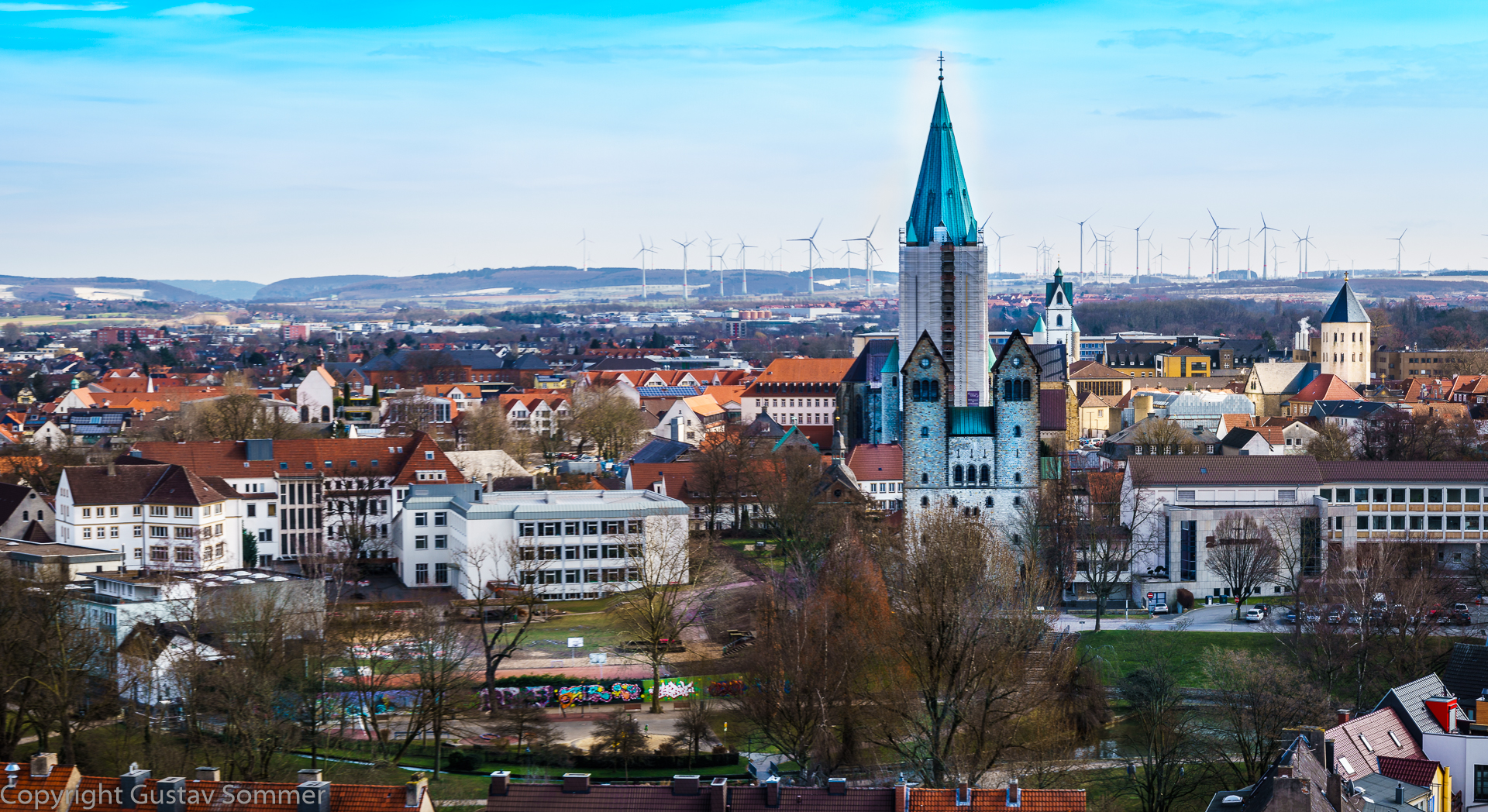
- Paderborn Cathedral Paderborn Town Hall Neuhaus Castle Skyline of Paderborn

- Flag Coat of arms

- Location of the city of Paderborn within the district
- Interactive map of Paderborn
- Location within Germany Location within North Rhine-Westphalia
- Coordinates: 51°43′05″N 8°45′15″E
- Country: Germany
- State: North Rhine-Westphalia
- Admin. region: Detmold
- District: Paderborn
- Subdivisions: 8

Government
  - Mayor (2025–30): Stefan-Oliver Strate (CDU)

Area
  - Total: 179.59 km^{2} (69.34 sq mi)
- Elevation: 94–347 m (308–1,138 ft)

Population (2025-12-31)
  - Total: 155,906
  - Density: 868.12/km^{2} (2,248.4/sq mi)
- Time zone: UTC+01:00 (CET)
  - Summer (DST): UTC+02:00 (CEST)
- Postal codes: 33041-33106
- Dialling codes: 05251, 05252, 05254, 05293
- Vehicle registration: PB
- Website: paderborn.de

Paderborn (German: [paːdɐˈbɔʁn]; Westphalian: Patterbuorn, also Paterboärn) is a city in eastern North Rhine-Westphalia, Germany, capital of the Paderborn district. The name of the city derives from the river Pader and Born, an old German term for the source of a river. The river Pader originates in more than 200 springs near Paderborn Cathedral, where St. Liborius is buried.

== History ==
Paderborn was founded as a bishopric by Charlemagne in 795, although its official history began in 777 when Charlemagne built a castle near the Paderborn springs. In 799 Pope Leo III fled his enemies in Rome and reached Paderborn, where he met Charlemagne, and stayed there for three months. It was during this time that it was decided that Charlemagne would be crowned emperor. Charlemagne reinstated Leo in Rome in 800 and was crowned as Holy Roman Emperor by Leo in return. In 836, St. Liborius became the patron saint of Paderborn after his bones were moved there from Le Mans by Bishop Badurad. St. Liborius is commemorated in Paderborn every July with the Liborifest. The bishop of Paderborn, Meinwerk, became a Prince of the Empire in 1100. The bishop had several large buildings built, and the area became a place for the emperors to stay.

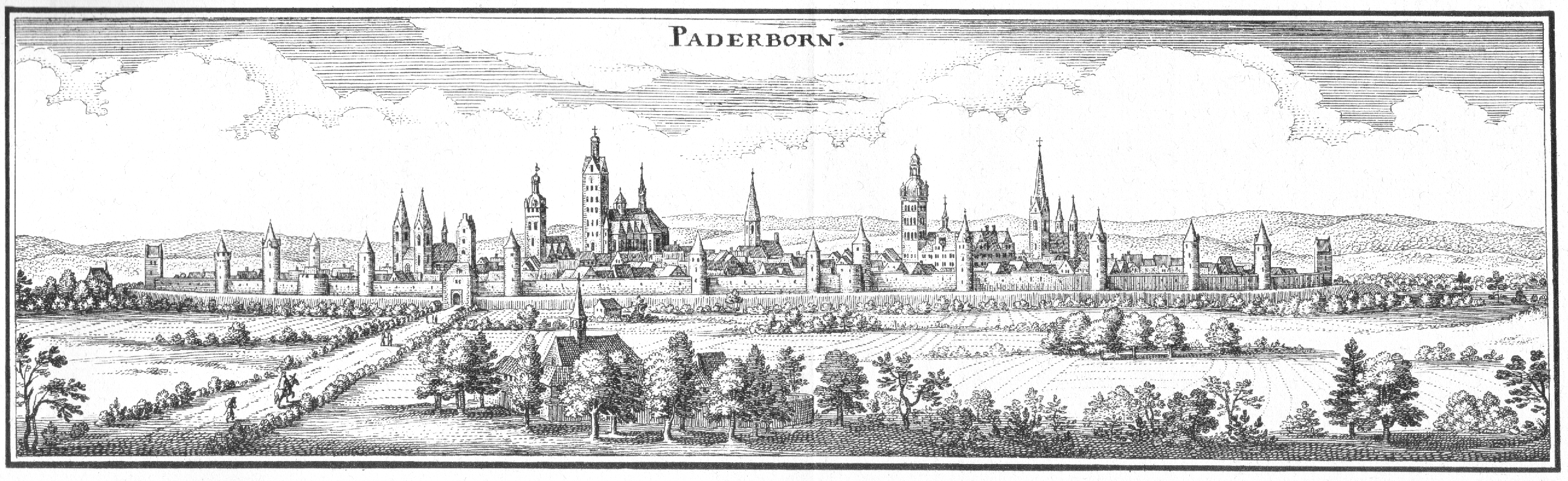
Paderborn in 1647

The city was taken by Prussia in 1802, then by the French vassal state Kingdom of Westphalia from 1807 to 1813 and then returned to Prussia.

Native Friedrich Sertürner, a pharmacist's apprentice in Paderborn, was the first to isolate morphine from opium in 1804.

In 1914 the Paderborn military camp was turned into a prisoner of war camp named Sennelager.

In 1930, the See of Paderborn was promoted to archdiocese.

During World War II, Paderborn was bombed by Allied aircraft in 1944 and 1945, resulting in 85% destruction, including many of the historic buildings. It was seized by the US 3rd Armored Division after a pitched battle 31 March – 1 April 1945, in which tanks and flamethrowers were used during combined mechanized-infantry assaults against the city's southwestern, southern and southeastern approaches.

After the city was reconstructed in the 1940s and 1950s, Paderborn became a major industrial seat in Westphalia. The British Army retained a significant presence in the area until 2020, when British units were relocated back to the United Kingdom. Only a small training and enabling staff remain at Paderborn to facilitate temporary deployments to use the Sennelager Training Area.

On 20 May 2022 Paderborn was hit by a tornado, leaving 38 injured and considerable damage along its path.

== Geography ==
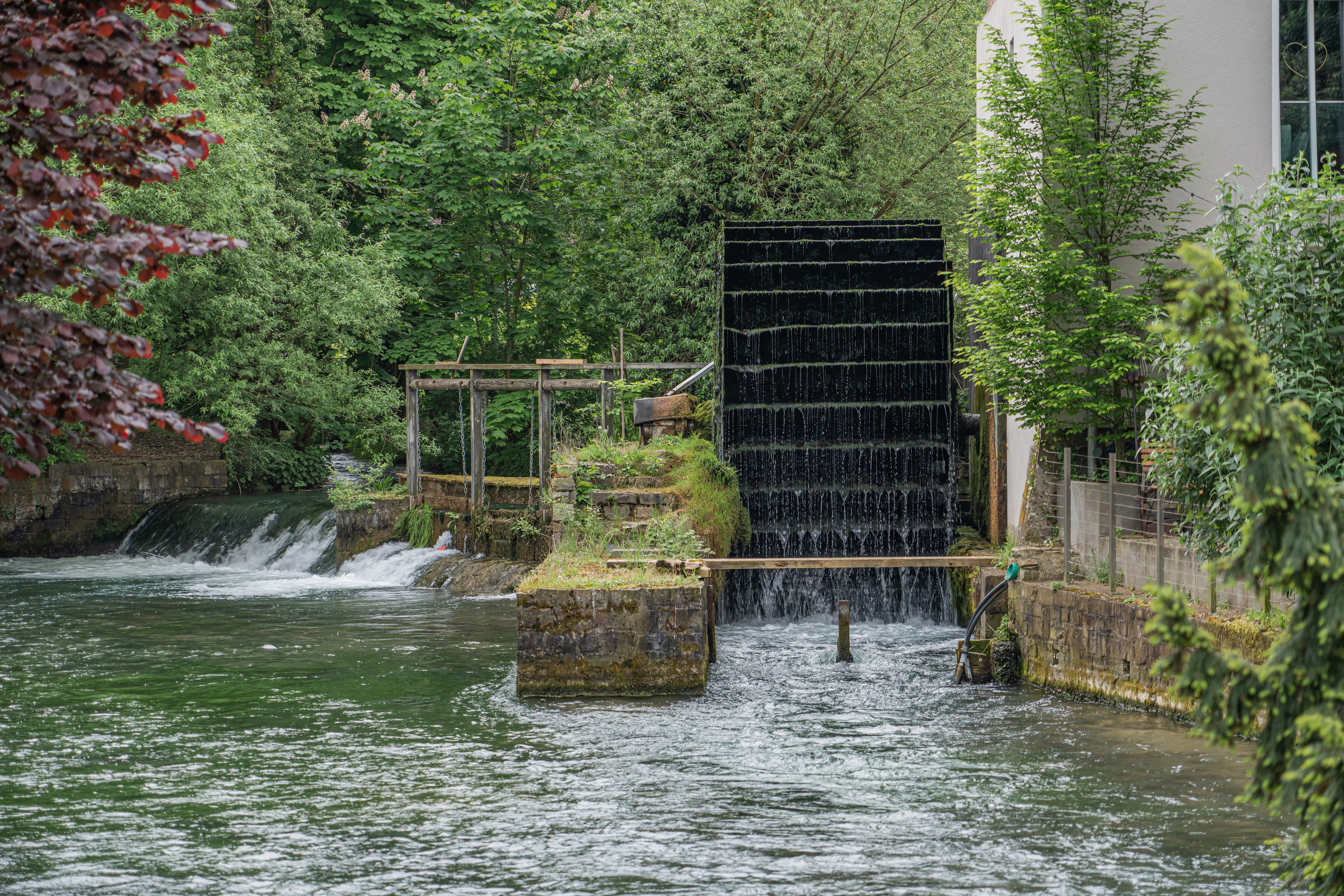
Pader River

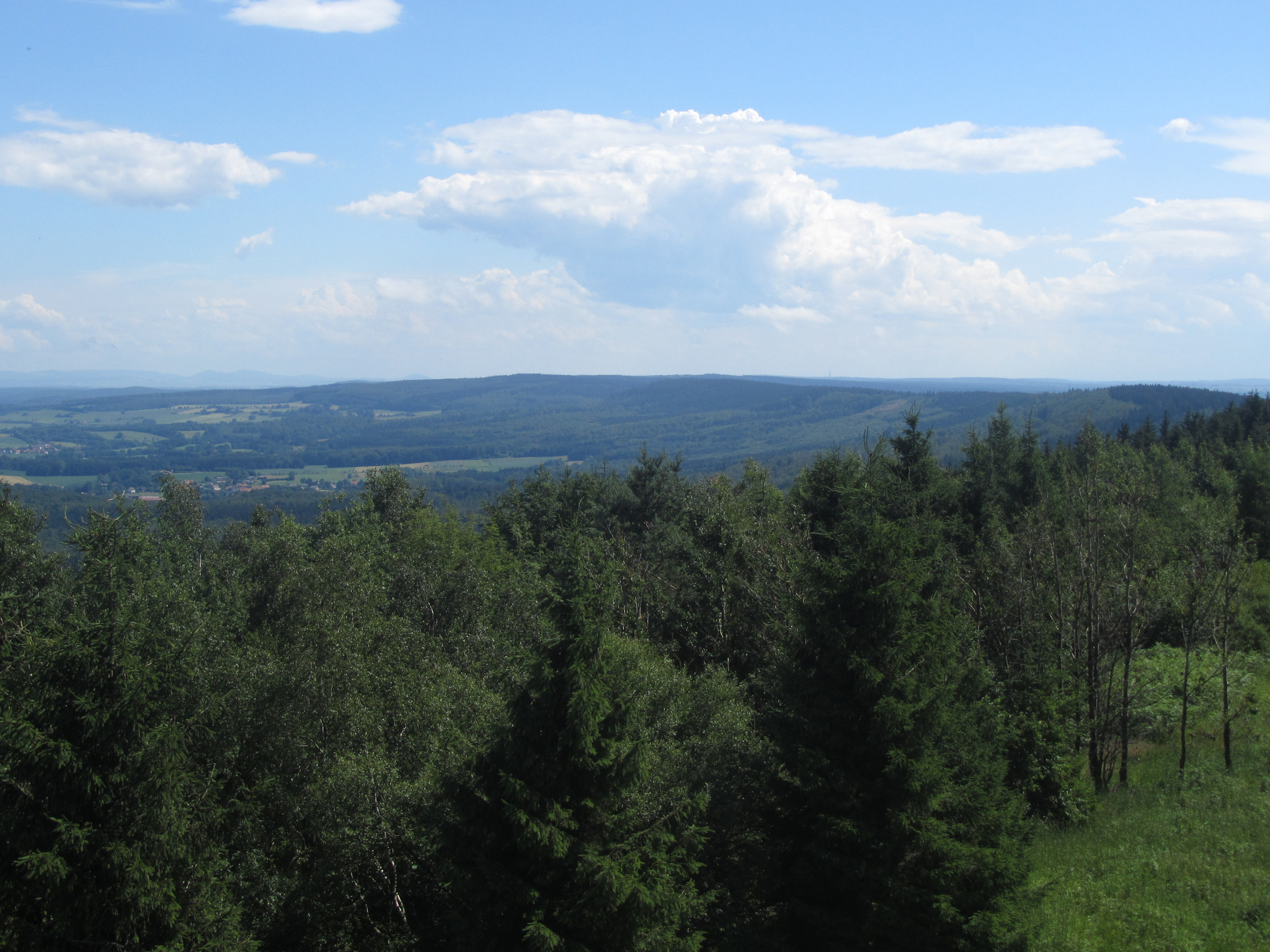
Eggegebirge

Paderborn is situated at the source of the river Pader, approximately 30 kilometres (19 mi) east of Lippstadt and approximately 50 kilometres (31 mi) south of Bielefeld on the Pader. The hills of the Eggegebirge are located east of the city. Paderborn is 104 kilometres (65 mi) east of Dortmund and the Ruhr region. To the north-west, Hannover is 115 kilometres (71 mi) away.

=== Neighbouring municipalities ===
- Altenbeken
- Bad Lippspringe
- Borchen
- Delbrück
- Hövelhof
- Lichtenau
- Salzkotten

=== Subdivisions ===
The city of Paderborn consists of the following Stadtteile (city sections):

- Paderborn (city center)
- Benhausen
- Dahl
- Elsen
- Marienloh
- Neuenbeken
- Sande
- Sennelager
- Schloß Neuhaus
- Wewer

== Climate ==
Climate data for Paderborn (Bad Lippspringe) (1991–2020 normals)
Month	Jan	Feb	Mar	Apr	May	Jun	Jul	Aug	Sep	Oct	Nov	Dec	Year
Mean daily maximum °C (°F)	4.6 (40.3)	5.5 (41.9)	9.4 (48.9)	14.3 (57.7)	18.2 (64.8)	21.3 (70.3)	23.6 (74.5)	23.3 (73.9)	19.0 (66.2)	13.9 (57.0)	8.7 (47.7)	5.4 (41.7)	13.9 (57.0)
Daily mean °C (°F)	2.1 (35.8)	2.5 (36.5)	5.4 (41.7)	9.4 (48.9)	13.2 (55.8)	16.2 (61.2)	18.2 (64.8)	18.1 (64.6)	14.3 (57.7)	10.2 (50.4)	6.0 (42.8)	3.0 (37.4)	9.9 (49.8)
Mean daily minimum °C (°F)	−0.6 (30.9)	−0.6 (30.9)	1.5 (34.7)	4.2 (39.6)	7.8 (46.0)	10.7 (51.3)	13.1 (55.6)	13.1 (55.6)	10.0 (50.0)	6.7 (44.1)	3.3 (37.9)	0.5 (32.9)	5.8 (42.4)
Average precipitation mm (inches)	87.6 (3.45)	64.0 (2.52)	64.8 (2.55)	53.0 (2.09)	64.4 (2.54)	70.8 (2.79)	90.2 (3.55)	85.7 (3.37)	77.0 (3.03)	76.6 (3.02)	79.6 (3.13)	88.6 (3.49)	902.5 (35.53)
Average precipitation days (≥ 1.0 mm)	19.0	16.8	16.5	13.6	14.7	15.5	15.9	15.7	15.1	16.8	18.3	20.4	198.4
Average snowy days (≥ 1.0 cm)	6.0	6.7	2.0	0.1	0	0	0	0	0	0	1.1	4.2	20.1
Average relative humidity (%)	83.9	81.2	76.6	70.2	70.7	72.1	71.7	72.3	78.0	81.9	85.1	85.5	77.4
Mean monthly sunshine hours	52.3	69.4	117.4	166.5	192.5	191.5	198.2	187.4	141.3	102.6	51.3	41.6	1,512.7
Source: World Meteorological Organization

== Demographics ==
Paderborn has a population of over 155,000, of which approximately 10% are students at the local Paderborn University. Additionally, about 10,000 members or relatives of members of the British armed forces live within Westfalen Garrison, but are not included in the nominal population size. Population of District Paderborn in 2025 is 310,000.

Largest groups of foreign residents https://www.kreis-paderborn.de/kreis_paderborn/der-kreis-paderborn/zahlen-und-fakten/Bevoelkerung.php
Nationality	Population (2011)
Turkey	2,210
Poland	1,212
Italy	1,206
United Kingdom	903
China	627
Russia	578
Serbia and Montenegro	573
Spain	326

Historical population

Year	Pop.	±% p.a.
1965	85,470	—
1970	94,503	+2.03%
1975	103,719	+1.88%
1980	110,163	+1.21%
1985	109,615	−0.10%
1990	120,680	+1.94%
1995	133,717	+2.07%

Year	Pop.	±% p.a.
2000	139,084	+0.79%
2005	143,769	+0.66%
2010	146,283	+0.35%
2015	148,126	+0.25%
2020	151,864	+0.50%
2025	155,906	+0.53%

Source: Landesdatabank Nordrhein-Westfalen

As of December 31, 2022, 14,574 foreign nationals were registered with the Paderborn District Immigration Office. Countries of origin of foreign nationals living in the Paderborn District: Ukraine 2,219 Poland 1,625 Syria 1,488 Romania 1,477 Turkey 1,144 Italy 531 Afghanistan 492 Russian Federation 408 Iraq 378 Bulgaria 343 United Kingdom 269 Kosovo 262 Hungary 259 Serbia 214 Greece 170 Iran 165 Croatia 160 Netherlands 150 Albania 131 Portugal 131 Spain 123 Nigeria 116 North Macedonia 111 Lithuania 109 Eritrea 108 other nations 1,991

60% of the population are Catholic, 20% Lutheran and 20% members of other faiths or not religious.

== Economy ==
Paderborn is the headquarters of the former Nixdorf Computer AG, which was acquired by Siemens in the early 1990s and known as Siemens-Nixdorf for about ten years. The company is now known as Diebold Nixdorf, which is still located in Paderborn, but Siemens retains a considerable presence in the city.

Many other information technology companies as well as industrial enterprises are located in Paderborn:

- Benteler AG (steel/tube, automotive, trade)
- Claas (farm machines)
- Deutsche Bahn AG (vehicle maintenance)
- dSPACE GmbH (engineering tools)
- Flextronics
- Fujitsu Technology Solutions
- Orga Systems GmbH
- Secure Computing Corporation
- Siemens AG (Siemens IT solutions and services)
- Zuken (PCB EMC analysis and design software)

Paderborn is also home of the Paderborner brewery, which has belonged to the Warsteiner group since 1990.

== Arts and culture ==
Paderborn has the largest computer museum in the world, the Heinz Nixdorf MuseumsForum, opened in 1996. From 2001 to 2005, it hosted the RoboCup German Open.

The town supports the Nordwestdeutsche Philharmonie for regular symphony concerts in the Paderhalle.

The city is currently known for its exhibitions in three museums: the Kaiserpfalz, The Diocesan Museum and the Art Museum - Städtische Galerie. The city also has some natural tourist attractions within and around it.

- The city has given its name to the Paderborn Gesangbuch of 1765, a collection of hymn tunes amongst which is one used in England as 'Paderborn' for the hymn 'Ye servants of God, your Master proclaim' (New English Hymnal 476).

=== Image gallery ===
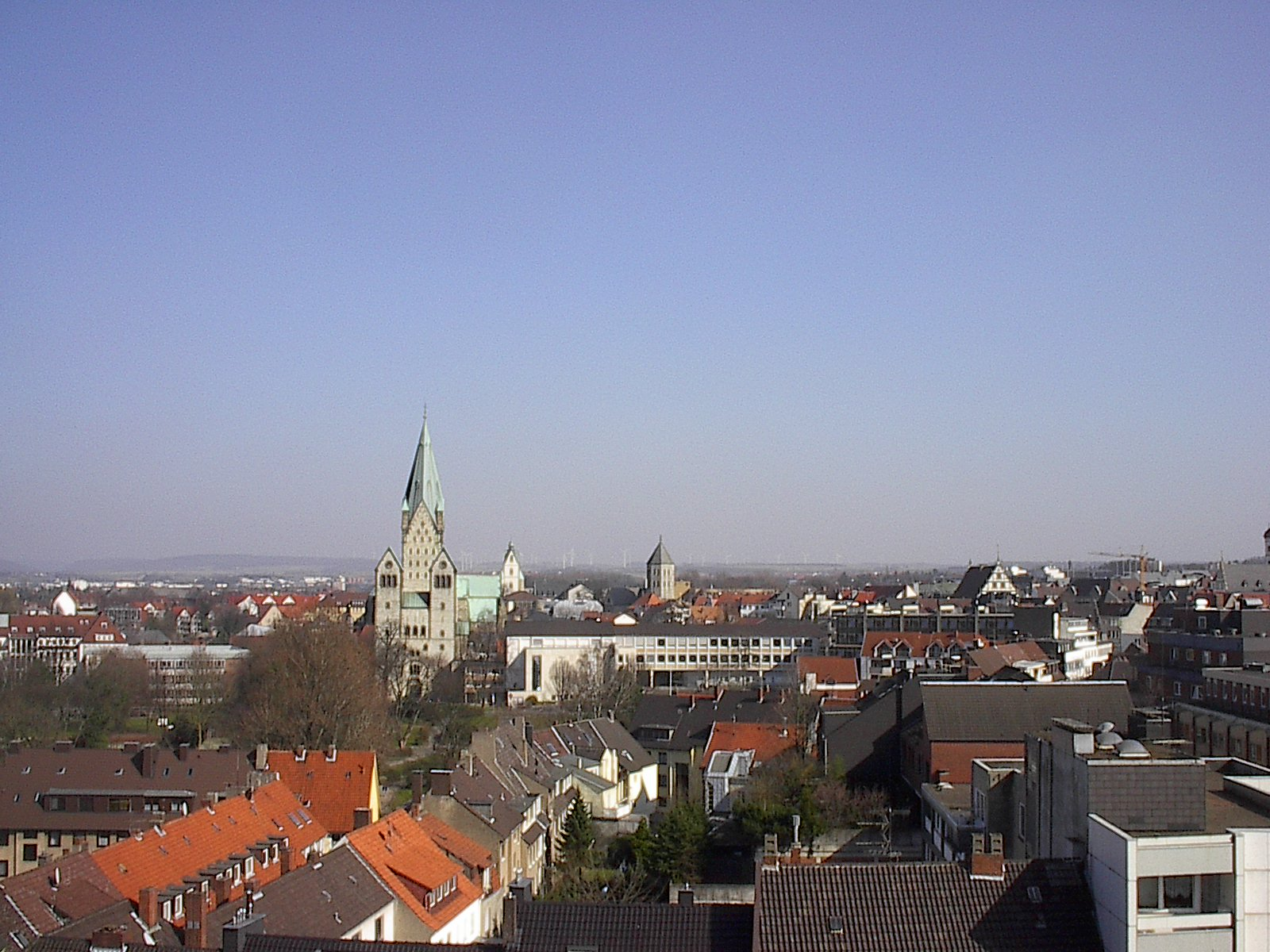
Central Paderborn and Cathedral

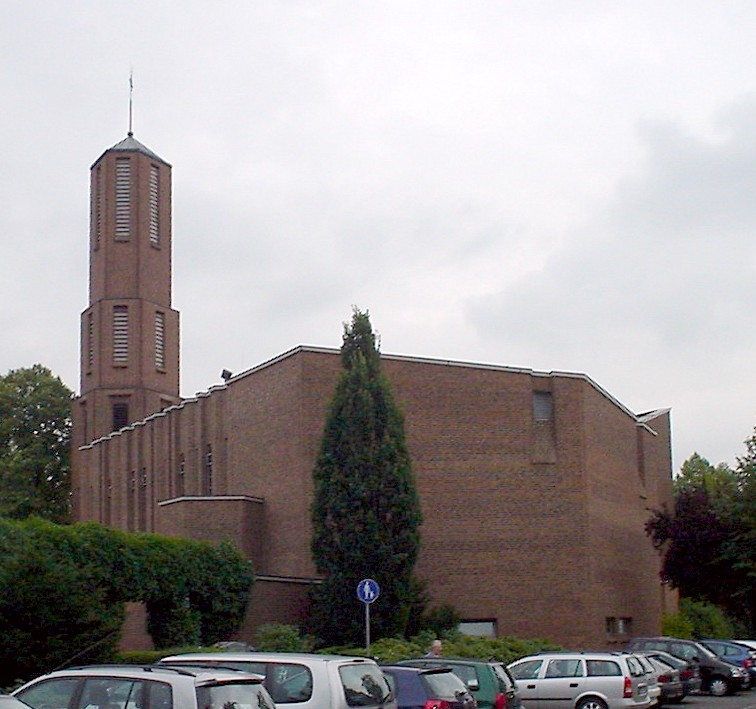
St. Bonifatius church, Paderborn

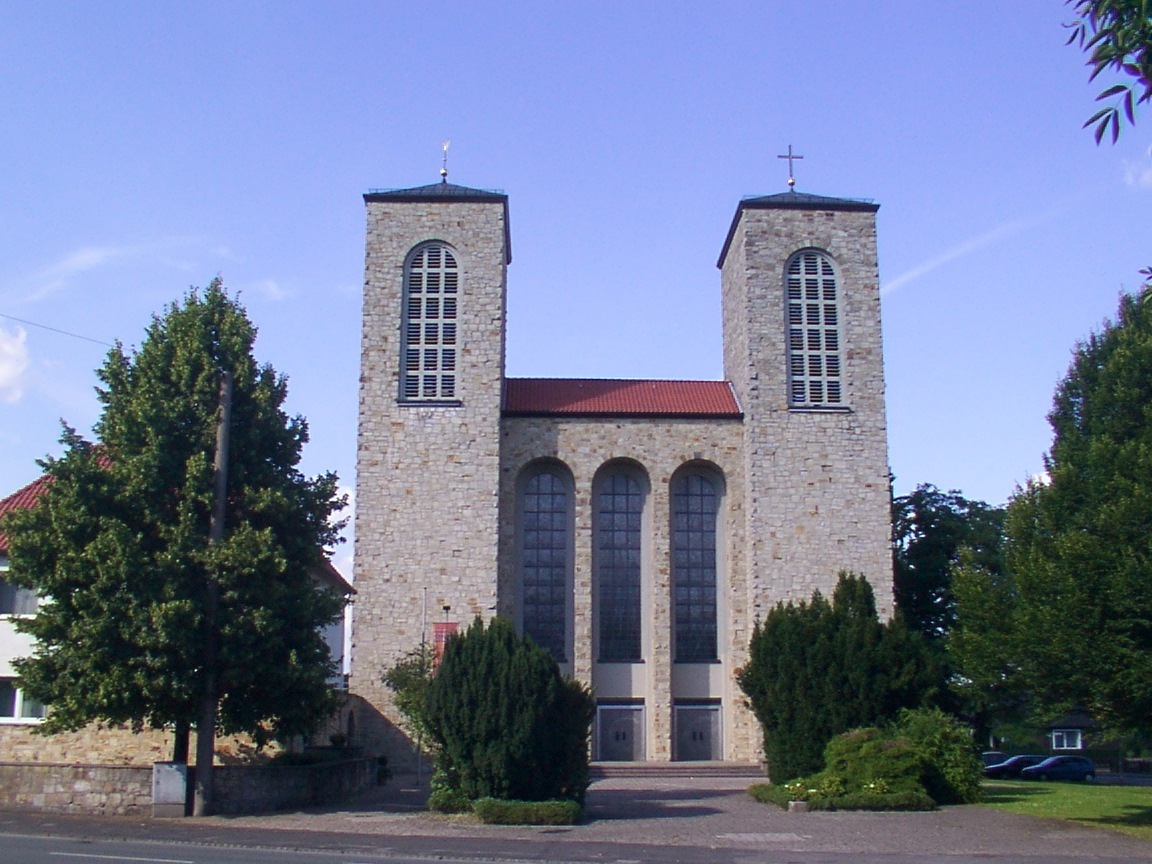
Saint George's church, Paderborn

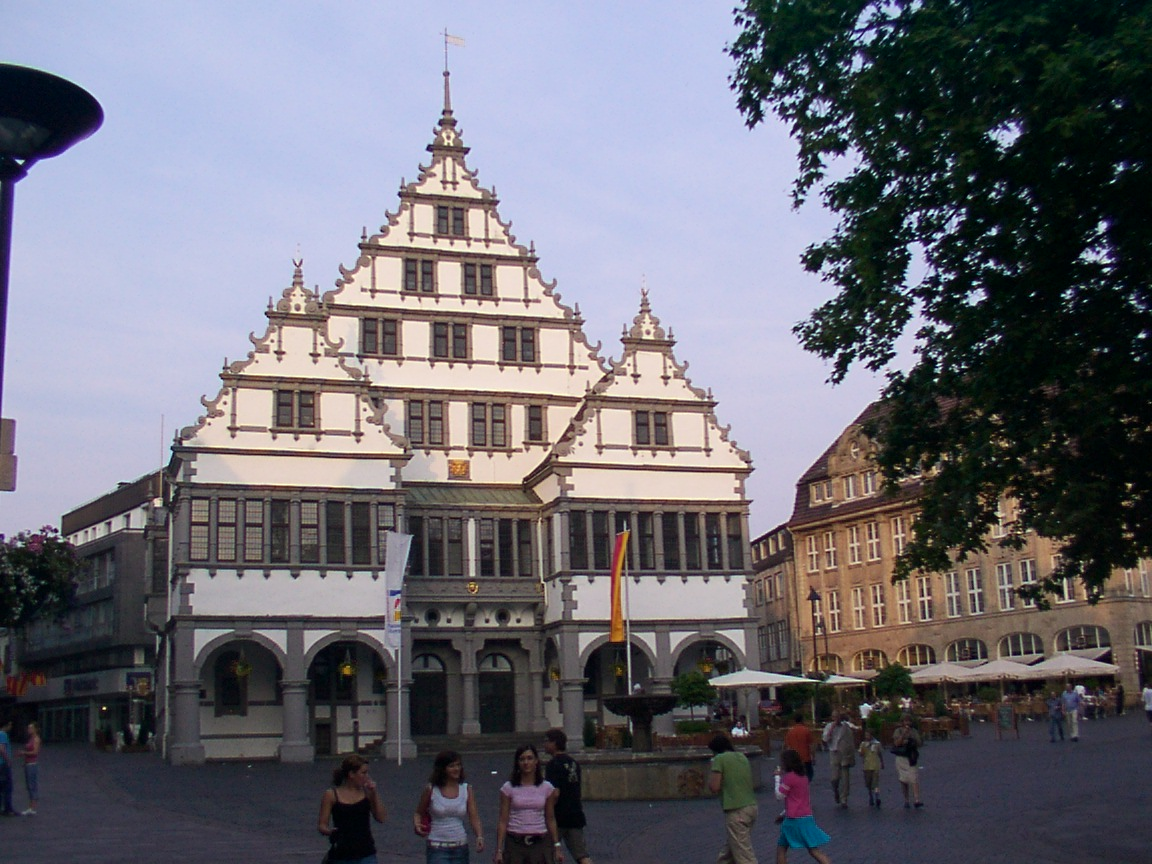
Town hall Paderborn (Rathaus)

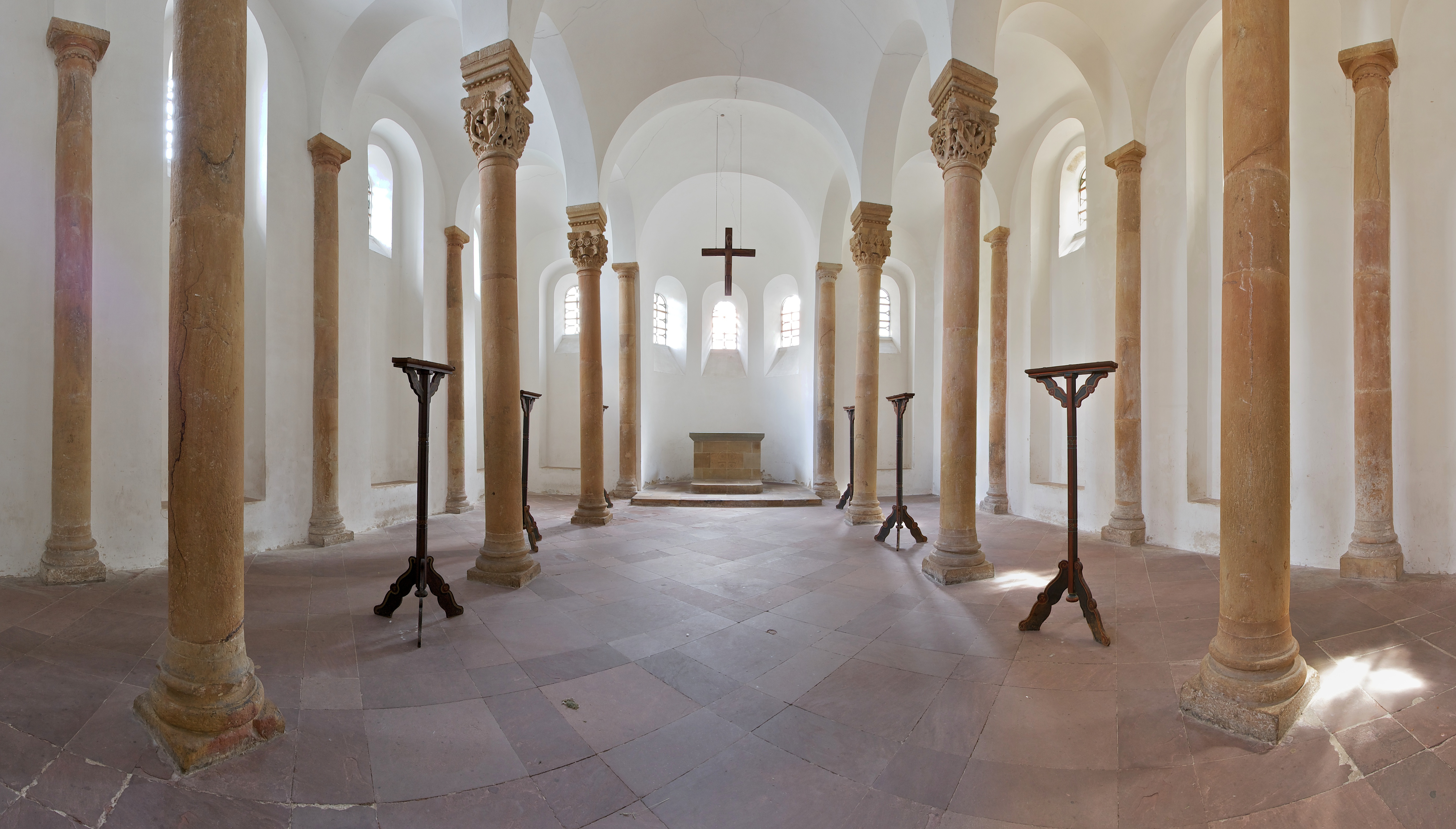
Inside the Bartholomäuskapelle

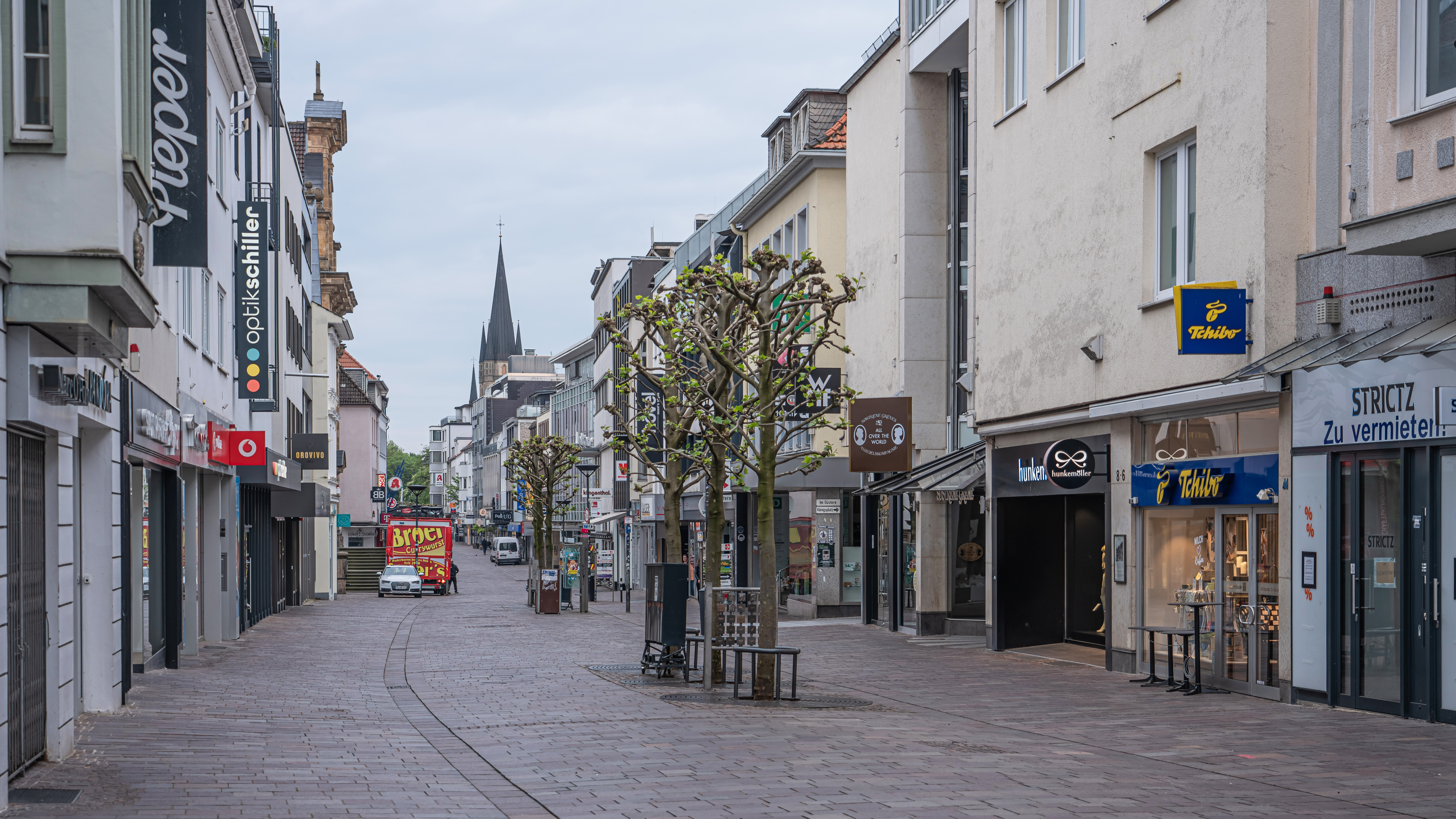
Pedestrian zone in Paderborn city center

== Politics ==
With the Archdiocese of Paderborn based in the city cathedral, Paderborn has traditionally been a conservative Catholic city. In the Bundestag, it is located in the eponymous electoral district, which is a safe seat for CDU. Only twice (1949 and 2021) has CDU not received a majority of the district's votes, and from 1953 to 1987 always received at least 60% of the district's vote. In the Landtag of North Rhine-Westphalia, the city currently located in the district Paderborn II, which also has a strong CDU lean.

At local level, the city has always elected CDU mayors since 1946. Until 2009, the CDU held an absolute majority on the city council, and as late as 1979 received over 60% of the vote in the city.

=== Mayor ===
The current mayor of Paderborn is Stefan-Oliver Strate of the Christian Democratic Union (CDU). The most recent mayoral election was held on 14 September 2025.

The most recent municipal elections was held on 14 September 2025, and the results were as follows:

Candidate	Party	Votes	%
Stefan-Oliver Strate	Christian Democratic Union	24,565	38.54
Frank Wolters	Alliance 90/The Greens	14,219	22.31
Roger Voightländer	Social Democratic Party	6,606	10.36
Reinhard Borgmeier	The Left	3,904	6.13
Marvin Weber	Alternative for Germany	9,396	14.74
Alexander Senn	Free Democratic Party	1,306	2.05
Stephan Hoppe	For Paderborn	2,660	4.17
Niko Rammert	Die PARTEI	1,078	1.69
Valid votes		63,734	99.30
Invalid votes		451	0.70
Total		64,185	100.0
Electorate/voter turnout		118,113	54.34
Source: City of Paderborn

=== City council ===
The Paderborn city council governs the city alongside the Mayor. The most recent city council election was held on 14 September 2025, and the results were as follows:

Party	Votes	%	+/-	Seats	+/-
Christian Democratic Union (CDU)	22,824	35.84	▼4.46	23	▼1
Alliance 90/The Greens (Grüne)	12,571	19.74	▼4.36	12	▼2
Social Democratic Party (SPD)	6,582	10.34	▼2.46	7	±0
Free Democratic Party (FDP)	2,150	3.38	▲0.68	2	▼1
Alternative for Germany (AfD)	9,799	15.39	▲10.29	10	▲7
The Left (Die Linke)	4,832	7.59	▲2.99	5	▲2
For Paderborn (Für PB)	2,390	3.75	▲0.95	2	±0
Die PARTEI	1,092	1.71	▼0.99	1	▼1
Free Citizens' Initiative – Free Voters (FBI)	549	0.86	▼0.14	1	±0
Volt Germany (Volt)	888	1.39	▲0.39	1	±0
Valid votes	63,677	99.19			
Invalid votes	517	0.81			
Total	64,194	100.0		60	▼4
Electorate/voter turnout	118,113	54.35	▲6.85		

== Twin towns – sister cities ==
Paderborn is twinned with:

- Le Mans, France (officially since 1967, traditionally since 836, the oldest partnership of its kind)
- Bolton, England, United Kingdom (1975)
- Belleville, Illinois, United States (1990)
- Pamplona, Spain (1992)
- Przemyśl, Poland (1993)
- Debrecen, Hungary (1994)
- Qingdao, China (2003)

== Sports ==
Paderborn is nationally known as a center for American Sports. The local baseball team, the Paderborn Untouchables, has won many German championships. The local American football team, the Paderborn Dolphins, has also enjoyed considerable success. In 2006 the Paderborn Baskets, the home basketball team of the city was promoted to the Bundesliga.

=== Paderborn Baskets (basketball) ===
In the past, the Paderborn Baskets played multiple seasons in the Basketball Bundesliga. They reached the playoffs in the 2008–09 season.

=== SC Paderborn 07 (football) ===
SC Paderborn 07 is the most successful football club in Paderborn. They were promoted to the Bundesliga, Germany's top flight, in 2019 but were relegated back to the 2. Bundesliga at the end of the same season.

The club was formed out of the 1985 merger of FC Paderborn and TuS Schloß Neuhaus as TuS Paderborn-Neuhaus and took on its current, shorter name in 1997, the 07 remembering the link with SV 07 Neuhaus. The Neuhaus club was founded in 1907 as SV 07 Neuhaus which was joined by the local side TuS 1910 Sennelager to become TuS Schloss Neuhaus in 1970. The Neuhaus and Paderborn teams played as tier III sides for most of their histories, as has the unified club. Today Paderborn plays its home matches at the Benteler Arena. In 2015, SC Paderborn were promoted to the Bundesliga for the first time. After their relegation in their first season, Paderborn returned to the Bundesliga in 2019 only to be relegated again. They were promoted to the Bundesliga again in 2026.

== Infrastructure ==
=== Transport ===
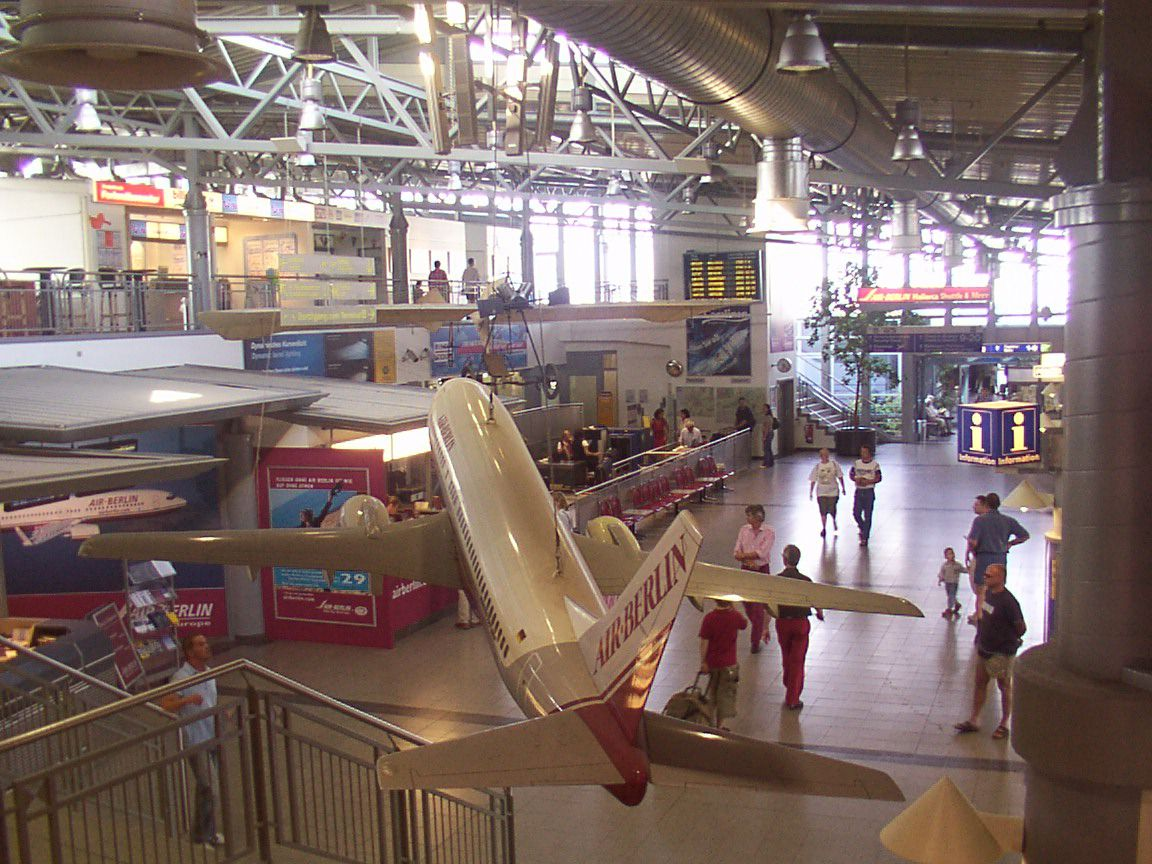
Paderborn Airport

Paderborn is located at the Autobahn A 33, which connects Paderborn to the Autobahn A 2 in the north and the Autobahn A 44 in the south.

The main station is a regular stop for the InterCity on the Hamm–Warburg line and several local trains.

The city is served by Paderborn Lippstadt Airport which connects Paderborn to some locations in Europe. There is a bus shuttle between the airport and the Paderborn main train station. General Aviation and gliders are based at Paderborn-Haxterberg (ICAO: EDLR) (site of the world gliding championships in 1981). However, the nearest major airport is Düsseldorf Airport, which is located 192 km (119 mi) south west of Paderborn.

In Paderborn there is a bus system served by the PaderSprinter for local buses and the Bahnbus Hochstift for regional buses.

== Education ==
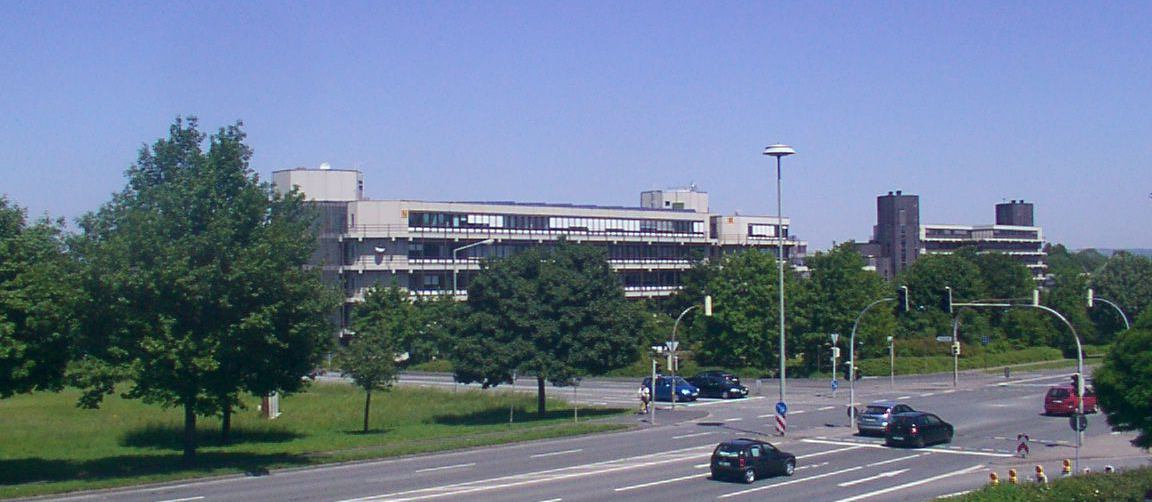
University of Paderborn

Paderborn was once the oldest academic site in Westphalia. In 1614, the University of Paderborn was founded by the Jesuits but was closed in 1819. It was re-founded in 1972 as Universität-Gesamthochschule and transformed into a university in its own right in 2002. Today, it is attended by about 20,000 students.

There also are several theological and private academic institutes in Paderborn.

There are a number of grammar schools in the city, the most prominent of which are the Theodorianum and St. Michael Gymnasium, along with others such as the Goerdeler-Gymnasium. There are also a few British primary schools such as John Buchan School, which was located in Sennelager and mainly educated children of British military personnel and the garrison's employees until its closure in 2019.

== Notable people ==
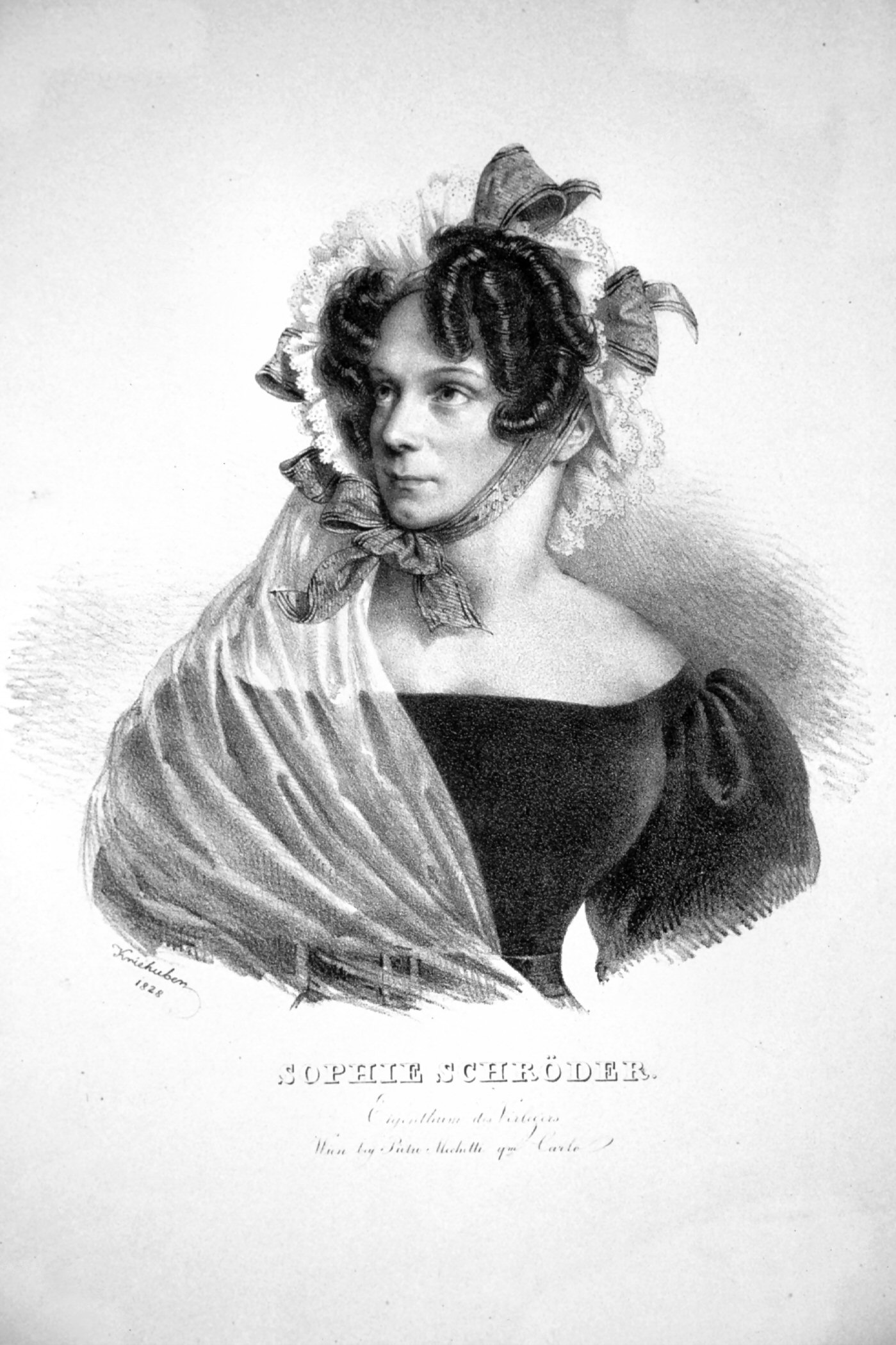
Sophie Schröder in 1828

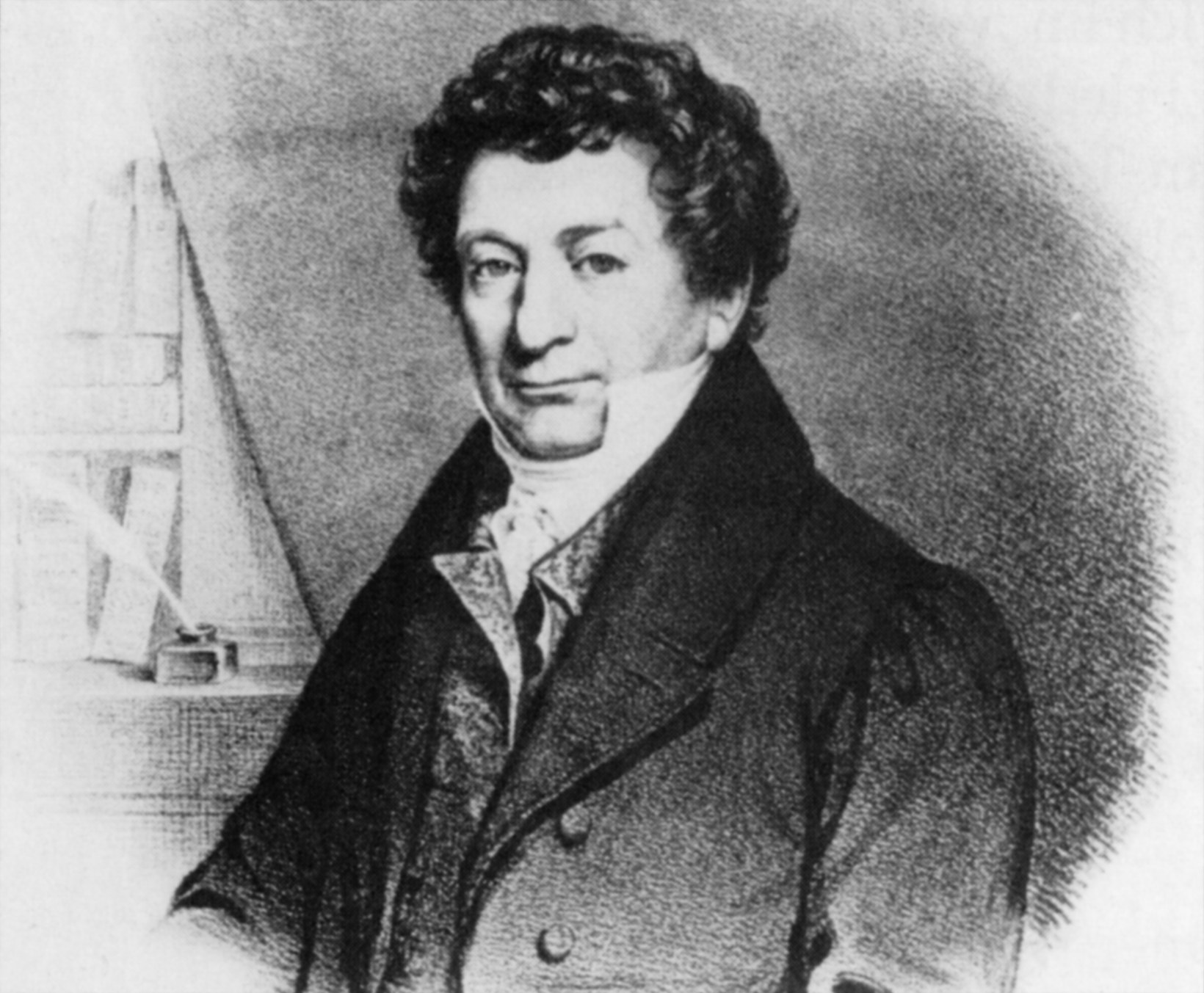
Friedrich Sertürner

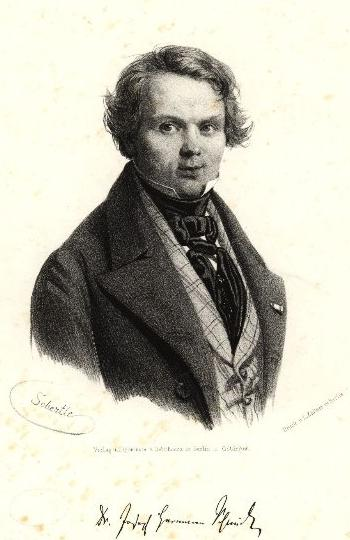
Joseph Hermann Schmidt

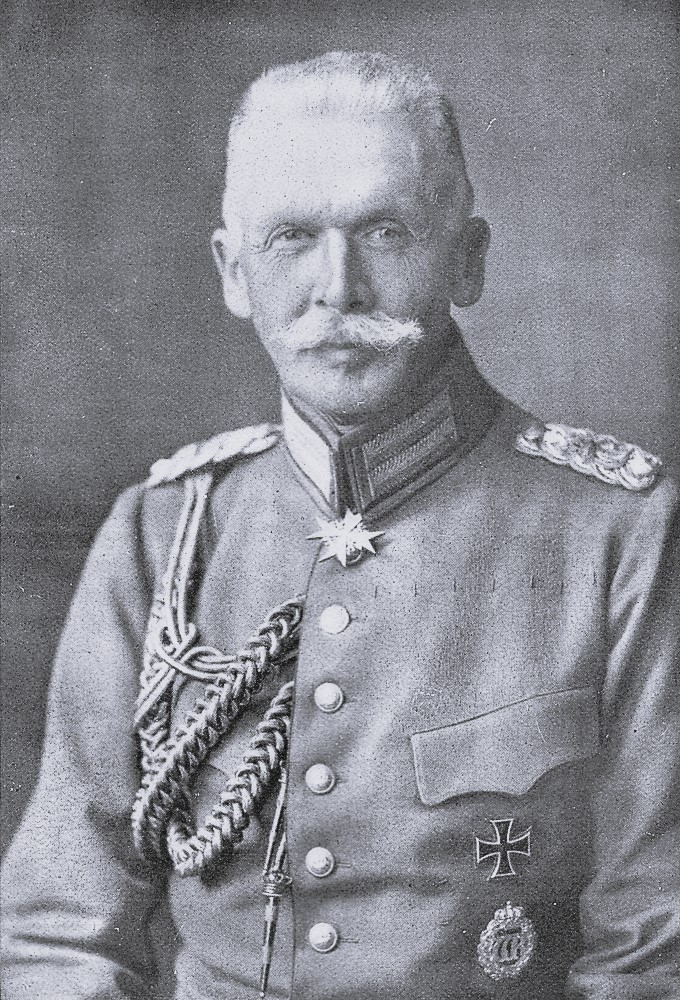
Karl von Plettenberg

- Heinrich Aldegrever (1502–1558?), painter and engraver
- Carl Ferdinand Fabritius (1637–1673), painter
- Franz Anton Cramer (1776–1829), apothecary, supported the discovery of morphine
- Sophie Schröder (1781–1868), singer and actress.
- Friedrich Sertürner (1783–1841), pharmacist, first to isolate morphine from opium
- Joseph Hermann Schmidt (1804–1852), physician, director, Charité Birth Department, Berlin
- George Henry Backhaus (1811–1882), Catholic priest
- Franz von Löher (1818–1892), politician, jurist and historian
- Christoph Ernst Friedrich von Forcade de Biaix (1821–1891), owner of the estate, judge and member of the German Reichstag
- Julius von Ficker (1826–1902), German-Austrian historian
- Joseph F. Rigge (1842–1913), the first president of Marquette College (now Marquette University)
- Aloys Loeher (1850–1904), American sculptor, exhibited at the 1893 Columbian Exposition
- Karl von Plettenberg (1852–1938), Prussian officer and later General of Infantry during WW1
- Clemens Baeumker (1853–1924), Catholic philosopher and philosophy historian
- Augustus F. Fechteler (1857–1921), rear admiral of the United States Navy during World War I
- Ella Bergmann-Michel (1895–1971), painter, photographer and documentary filmmaker
- Gustav Simon (1900–1945), Nazi Gauleiter in the Moselland Gau from 1940 until 1944 and Chief of the Civil Administration in occupied Luxembourg, died here
- Josef Wirmer (1901–1944), jurist and resistance fighter against National Socialism
- Jenny Aloni (1917–1993), German-Israeli writer
- Friedrich Wilhelm Christians (1922–2004), banker
- Heinz Nixdorf (1925–1986), computer pioneer, entrepreneur and founder of Nixdorf Computer AG
- Walter Salmen (1926–2013), musicologist
- Werner Franke (1940–2022), professor of cell and molecular biology
- Ulrich Vogt (born 1941), teacher and non-fiction author
- Mechtild Rothe (born 1947), politician (SPD) and member of the European Parliament
- Franz-Josef Bode (born 1951), bishop of the Roman Catholic Diocese of Osnabruck since 1995
- Rüdiger Hoffmann (born 1964), cabaret artist and musician
- Bernd Hüttemann (born 1970), Vice President of the European Movement International and Secretary General of the European Movement Germany
- Stefan Gödde (born 1975), television presenter, radio presenter and reporter
- Judith Rakers (born 1976), journalist and television supporter (ARD)
- Daniel Sieveke (born 1976), politician
- Carsten Linnemann (born 1977), economist and politician (CDU), member of the German Bundestag

=== Sport ===
- Klaus Ehl (born 1949), athlete (sprinter)
- Hans-Günther Vosseler (born 1949), swimmer
- Andreas Fischer (born 1964), footballer
- Günter Kutowski (born 1965), footballer
- Martin Driller (born 1970), footballer
- Reiner Plaßhenrich (born 1976), football player and coach
- Tolgay Ali Arslan (born 1990), footballer
- Jasmin Duehring (born 1992), Canadian cyclist
- Alexander Nübel (born 1996), footballer

== See also ==
- Paderborn method for teaching languages
- Disappearance of Katrice Lee
