= Ulrich Vogt =

German educator and author (born 1941)

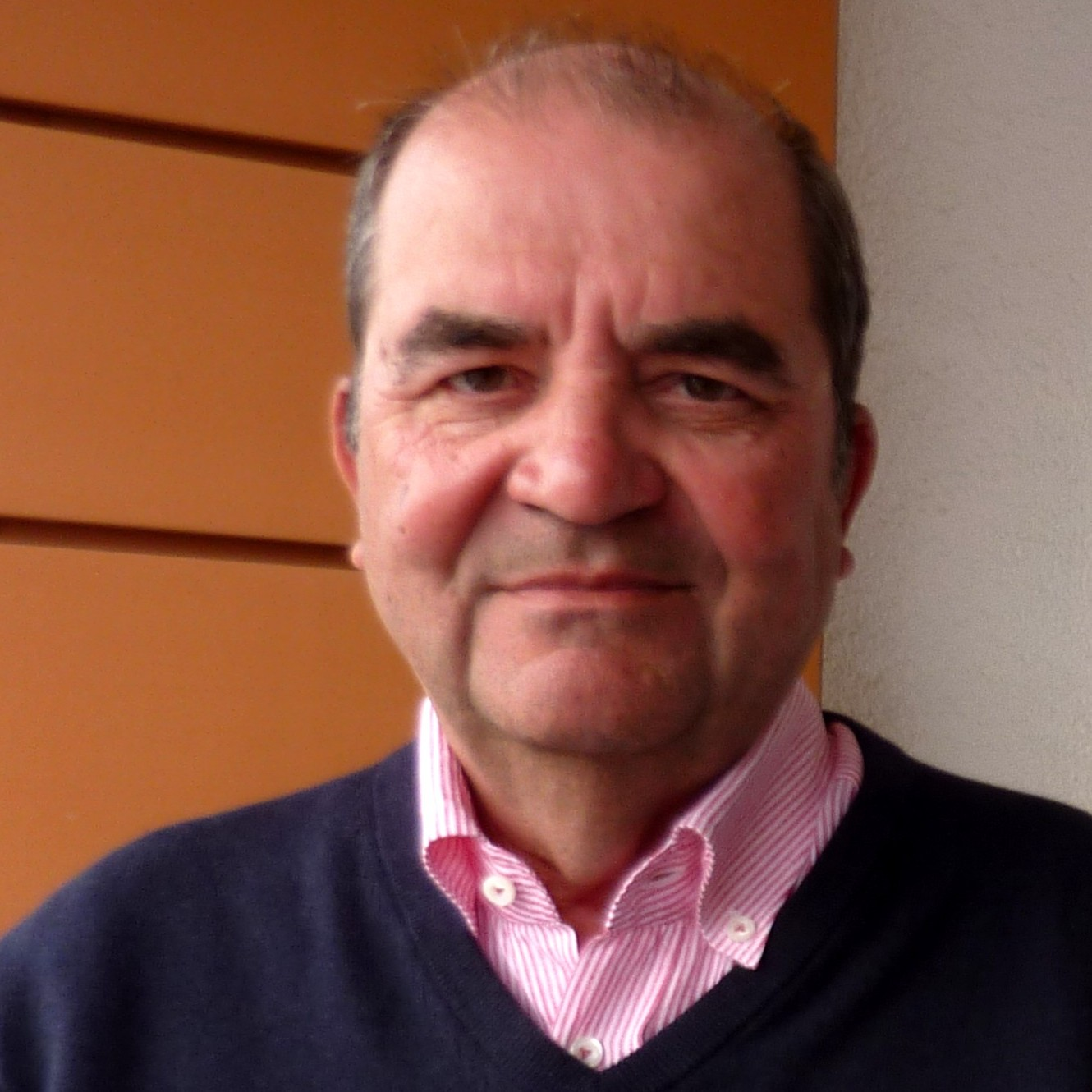
Ulrich Vogt in 2013

Ulrich Vogt (born May 15, 1941) is a German educator and author.

Vogt grew up in Soest, where he attended the Maria zur Wiese elementary school and the Archigymnasium Soest gymnasium. When he was 18, he and his family moved to Paderborn. There, he was a student at the Reismann Gymnasium, from which he received his diploma. He next attended teachers' colleges in Münster and Bielefeld, studying art education, German, mathematics and sports. Soon after passing his qualifying exam at Bielefeld in 1965, he became a teacher at the volksschule in Schwaney, a small village near Paderborn. In 1968 he passed his next level of qualifying exams and immediately was made Head of Art at the newly founded District Department of Teacher Education. In the same year, he also began as a teacher at the Bonifatius Hauptschule in Paderborn. For seven years he taught art education at the Paderborn location of the teachers' college of Westphalia-Lippe and the University of Paderborn, was chief instructor in art education in the Paderborn centre for teacher training, and for five years was honorary editor in chief of the magazine Photographica Cabinett. He retired as an educator in 2002 after almost 40 years.

Vogt has written several books. His tenth, Der Würfel ist gefallen – 5000 Jahre rund um den Kubus (The Die is Cast - 5000 Years Around the Cube) looks at the history and imagery related to dice and like his previous book, Zahlen, bitte! - Ein mathematisches Bilderbuch (Numbers, Please! - A Mathematical Picturebook; 2009) was published in cooperation with the Heinz Nixdorf MuseumsForum, a computer museum in Paderborn. Other publications include a series of historical books about the city of Paderborn, a book about Rollei camera designer Heinz Waaske, and books of computer education for children.

He has been married since 1962 and has two children.

== Books (selection) ==
- with Jörg Eikmann: Kameras für Millionen, Heinz Waaske, Konstrukteur für Rollei, Voigtländer, Minox und Robot. Hückelhoven: Wittig Verlag, 1996, ISBN 3-930359-56-1
- Wie Bonni und Logi mit Word kreativ schreiben und zeichnen. Ein Computerkurs für Kinder ab dem 3. Schuljahr. Paderborn: Verlag Schöningh, 2001, ISBN 3-14-014050-9
- Wie Bonni, Logi und Harald im Internet surfen - Ein interaktiver Computerkurs für Kinder vom 3. bis 6. Schuljahr. Paderborn: Verlag Schöningh, 2001, ISBN 3-14-014051-7
- Farbiges Paderborn – einst und jetzt, Spurensuche in einer alten Stadt mit Farbfotos von 1937, 1981 und 2002. 2nd ed. Paderborn, 2003, ISBN 3-929507-14-5
- Die Kinder vom Ikenberg, Paderborn im Zweiten Weltkrieg. Paderborn: H & S Verlag, 2003, ISBN 3-929507-15-3
- Das Paderborner ABC - Buchstaben als Spuren der Geschichte einer alten Stadt. Paderborn: H & S Verlag, 2005, ISBN 3-929507-17-X
- PC-Kunst-Stücke mit Bonni und Logi - Kreative Ideen für den fächerübergreifenden Computerunterricht mit Kindern. Paderborn: Verlag Schöningh, 2006, ISBN 3-14-014052-5
- ABC-WELTEN fächerübergreifend erfahrbar machen. Paderborn: Verlag Schöningh, 2007, ISBN 3-14-013240-9
- Zahlen, bitte! - Ein mathematisches Bilderbuch. Paderborn: Uvo Verlag, 2009, ISBN 978-3-00-027080-2
- Der Würfel ist gefallen - 5000 Jahre rund um den Kubus. Hildesheim / Zurich / New York: Georg Olms Verlag, 2012, ISBN 978-3-487-08518-0
- Goethe-Bilder auf ... Postkarten, Briefmarken, Geldscheinen, Sammelbildern, Stereofotos, Bierdeckeln. Georg Olms Verlag, Hildesheim/Zürich/New York, 2016, ISBN 978-3-487-08572-2
- Mein Paderborn in Farbe - Fotoschätze aus mehr als 100 Jahren. Bonifatius Verlag, Paderborn, 2017, ISBN 978-3-89710-748-9
- Das Paderborner ABC - Buchstaben als Spuren der Geschichte einer alten Stadt. Neuauflage, Bonifatius Verlag, Paderborn, 2018, ISBN 978-3-89710-806-6
- with Andreas Gaidt & Wilhelm Grabe:Paderborn in Farbe 5.0 – Von frühen Farbaufnahmen bis zu heutigen Digitalfotografien. Bonifatius Verlag, Paderborn, 2019, ISBN 978-3-89710-824-0
- Dresden in Farbe - Farbfotografien von der Vorkriegszeit, Kriegszeit und frühen Nachkriegszeit bis zur Gegenwart. Thelem Universitätsverlag Dresden, 2022, ISBN 978-3-95908-569-4
