= St. Bonifatius, Paderborn =

Church in Paderborn, Germany

Coordinates: 51°44′16″N 8°45′25″E

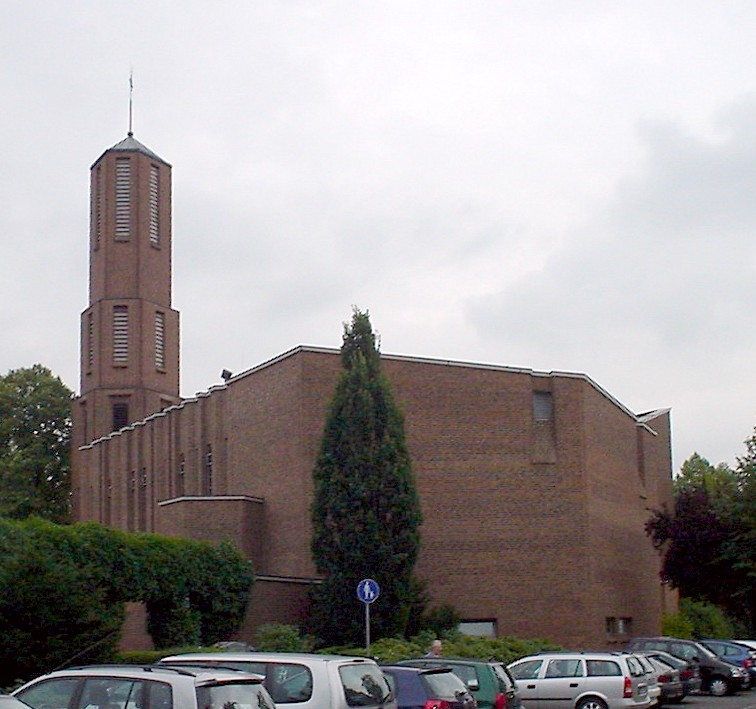
View on the church Saint Boniface

Saint Bonifatius is the Roman Catholic church in Stadtheide, a quarter of the German city Paderborn which belongs to the Deanship of Paderborn in Archiocese of Paderborn.

== History ==
The church is still very young: The history of this church started in 1919 when Stadtheide was changing from a sparsely populated rural are to a more built up area.

After World War II the building was damaged and needed building repairs. As a consequence of the growing population of the area and increased member numbers, it was decided to build a new building and pull down the old one.

The architect Johannes Schilling from Cologne was charged with the organisation of the new building. The new church was consecrated by the Archbishop of Paderborn Johannes Joachim Degenhardt on 6 June 1981.

After the church itself and the Kindergarten Saint Boniface were built, a Pfarrheim (presbytery) was added. This building was finished in 1988.

Since 2004 the church has been administered together with the churches Saint Heinrich and Saint Stephanus in Paderborn. This administrative unit of three churches is named Pastoralverbund Paderborn Nord-Ost. In future it is planned to add three more churches to the Pastoralverbund.

== Groups and organisations ==
The church has an own youth organisation, the Bonijugend. This organisation organises activities for children at the age of 9+ years and helps with events of the church. In addition to that there is a camp of tents every year in the first two weeks of the summer holidays in North Rhine-Westphalia which takes place in the Sauerland and is very popular with the kids in the Stadtheide.
