= Friedrich Sertürner =

German pharmacist (1783 – 1841)

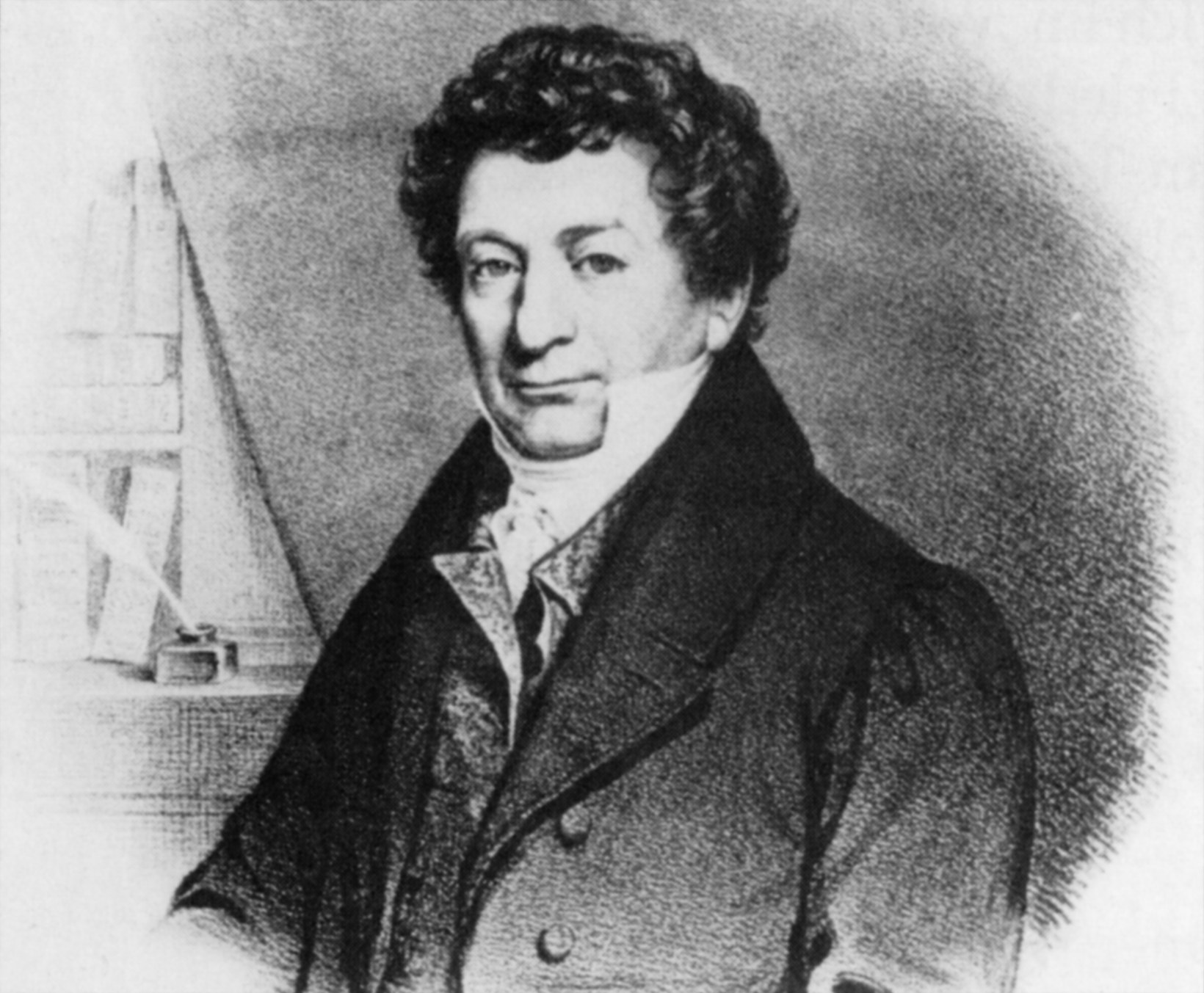
- Born: Friedrich Wilhelm Adam Sertürner; 19 June 1783; Schloß Neuhaus, Prince-Bishopric of Paderborn, Holy Roman Empire
- Died: 20 February 1841 (aged 57); Hamelin, Kingdom of Hanover, German Confederation
- Known for: Discovering morphine
- Scientific career
- Fields: Pharmacology, Alkaloid chemistry

Friedrich Wilhelm Adam Sertürner (German pronunciation: [ˈfʁiːdʁɪç ˈvɪlhɛlm ˈʔaːdam ˈzɛʁtʏʁnɐ]; 19 June 1783 – 20 February 1841) was a German pharmacist and a pioneer of alkaloid chemistry. He is best known for his discovery of morphine, which he isolated from opium in 1804, and for conducting tests, including on himself, to evaluate its physiological effects.

== Biography ==
Sertürner was born, the fourth of six children, to Joseph Simon Serdinier and Marie Therese Brockmann on 19 June 1783, in Neuhaus, Holy Roman Empire (now part of Paderborn). The family may have had origins in Sardinia. His father called himself an architectus, serving surveyor and engineer to the prince bishop. After his father died, he became a pharmacist's apprentice at the Cramersche Hofapotheke in Paderborn. He completed the apprenticeship in four years and passed the qualifying examination on 2 August 1803.

Sertürner worked on the isolation of morphine from opium from 1804. He called the isolated alkaloid "morphium" after the Greek god of dreams, Morpheus. He published a comprehensive paper on its isolation, crystallization, crystal structure, and pharmacological properties, which he studied first in stray dogs and then in self-experiments. Morphine was not only the first alkaloid to be extracted from opium, but the first ever alkaloid to be isolated from any plant. Thus Sertürner became the first person to isolate the active ingredient associated with a medicinal plant or herb. The branch of science that he originated has since become known as alkaloid chemistry.

In 1806 Sertürner moved to Einbeck, working as a pharmacists' assistant to Ratsapotheker Daniel Wilhelm Hinck (1783 -1813). In 1809, Sertürner opened the first pharmacy he owned, in Einbeck. Between 1812 and 1814 he dabbled in work to improve guns and cannons for the army and navy. In 1813 his right to run the pharmacy had to be contested and he lost the case in 1817. He however got his brother-in-law Heinrich Karl Daniel Bolstorff to take over his pharmacy and move to Hamelin where he worked as Ratsapotheke succeeding Johann Friedrich Westrumb (1751-1819). He continued to investigate the effects of morphine. After the publication of his paper "Ueber das Morphium als Hauptbestandteil des Opiums" in 1817, his work on morphine became more widely known and morphine became more widely used. In 1821 he married Eleonore Dorette von Rettberg of Einbeck and would have six children. In 1822, Sertürner bought the main pharmacy in Hamelin (Rathaus Apotheke), where he worked until his death on 20 February 1841. Around 1831 he was involved in studying a cholera epidemic that affected Hamelin and recognized an organismic cause for the disease. He suffered from arthritis during his last years and it is said that he took morphine for relief. There have been suggestions that he may have become addicted. The autopsy noted that his entire body gave the appearance of dropsy. He was buried in Einbeck. His son Victor took up the position of Ratsapotheke after his death.

== Isolation of morphine ==
During his efforts to isolate morphine from opium between 1804 and 1816, Sertürner relied on animal and human testing to evaluate the results of his work. In 1805, he published a paper in Johann Trommsdorff’s Journal der Pharmacie (volume 13), calling it meconic acid. In volume 14 he called it the Principium somniferum of opium. His 1806 paper describes a highly impure alcoholic extract of opium that was tested on a mouse and three dogs, one of which died as a result.

As described in his 1817 paper, he finally found success extracting colourless crystals of pure morphine by precipitation. He dissolved the crystals in alcohol and tested the effects of this solution by swallowing it together with 3 boys, “none older than seventeen years.” He administered it gradually, in three doses of half-grains. After the third dose, symptoms of intoxication increased to an almost fatal extent. Concerned by this result, Sertürner drank several ounces of vinegar along with the boys, inducing extreme vomiting. He was not fully conscious while responding to the situation:

It presented as pain in the region of the stomach, exhaustion, and severe narcosis that came close to fainting. I also was subject to the same fate. Being in the supine position, I fell into a dream-like state and sensed in the extremities, particularly the arms, a slight twitching which accompanied the pulse beats. These distinct symptoms of true intoxication, particularly the frail condition of the three young men, caused me so much concern that I, half unconscious, drank more than a quarter of a bottle (6 to 8 ounces) of strong vinegar and also had the others do the same.

Sertürner hypothesized that, because lower doses of the drug were needed, it would be less addictive. However, he became addicted to the drug, warning that "I consider it my duty to attract attention to the terrible effects of this new substance I called morphium in order that calamity may be averted." It was renamed to morphine by Joseph Louis Gay-Lussac in 1817.

Heinrich Emanuel Merck began the sale of morphine a few years after Sertürner's paper was published. Jean-Francois Derosne and Armand Séguin have both been claimed to have discovered morphine before Sertürner.

== Recognition ==
In 1817 Sertürner was awarded an honorary doctorate from Jena University. The degree was initiated by Goethe who also had Sertürner inducted into the Jenaer Societät für die gesammte Mineralogie as an honorary member. Gay Lussac brought attention in France to the work of Sertürner. In 1831, Sertürner received the Montyon Prize from the Institut de France with the title ‘Benefactor of Humanity’. In 1924, a street in Münster was named after him as Sertürnerstraße.
