= Jean-François Cail =

French entrepreneur and industrialist (1804–1871)

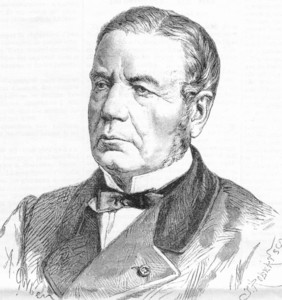
Jean-François Cail (1804-1871).

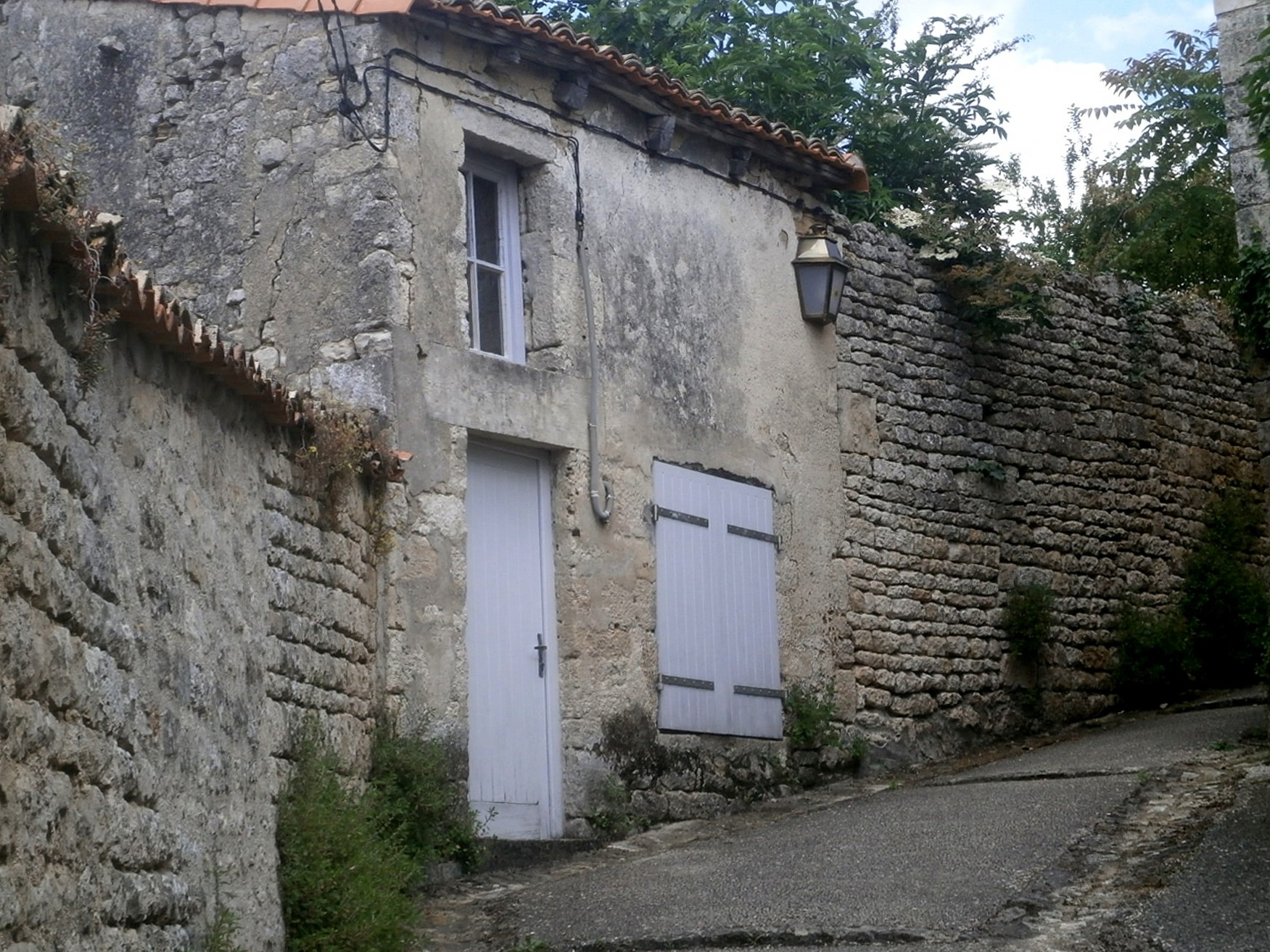
Birthplace of Jean-François Cail, Chef-Boutonne, France

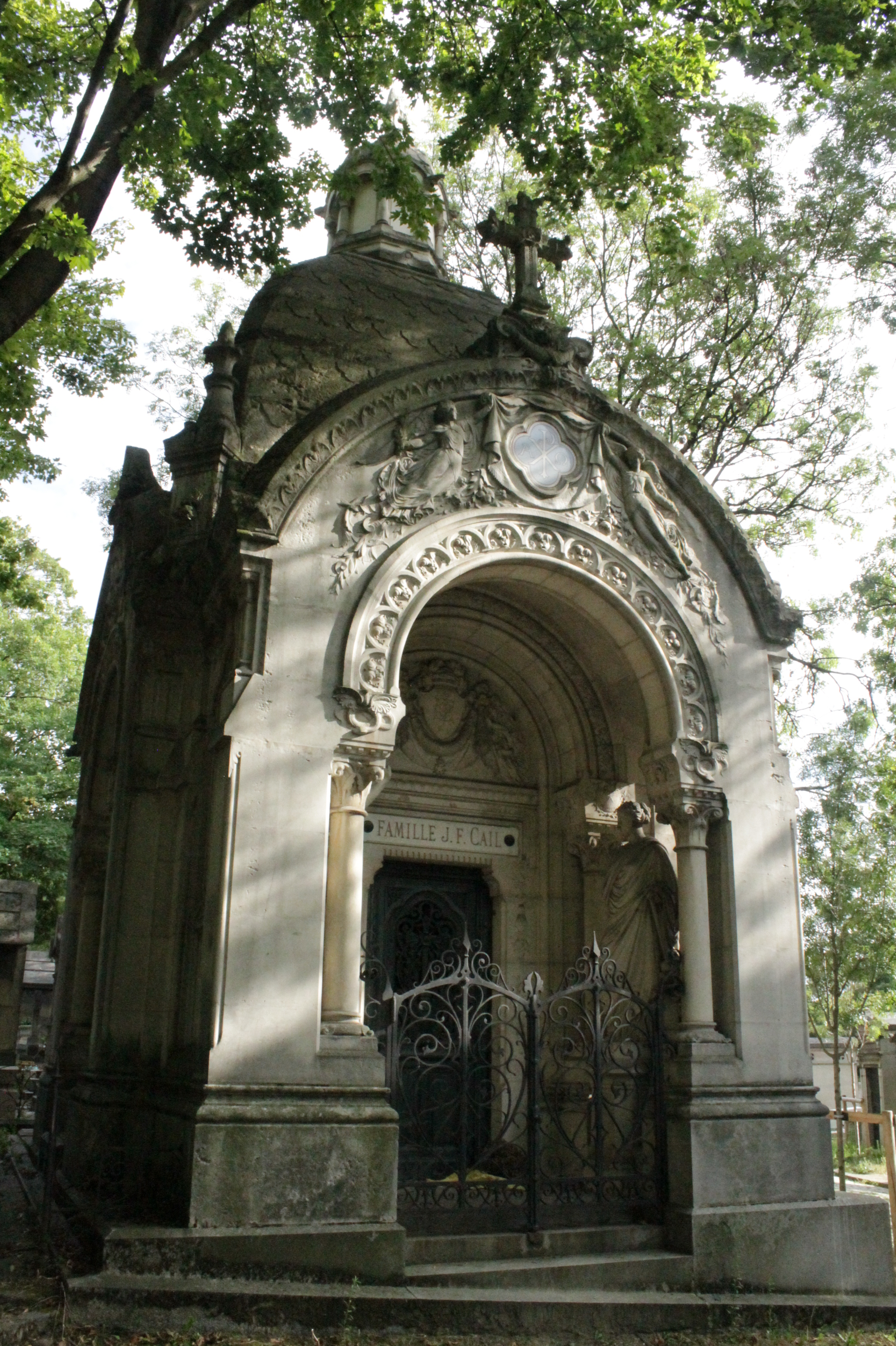
The tomb of Jean-Francois Cail, Pere La Chaise Cemetery, Paris

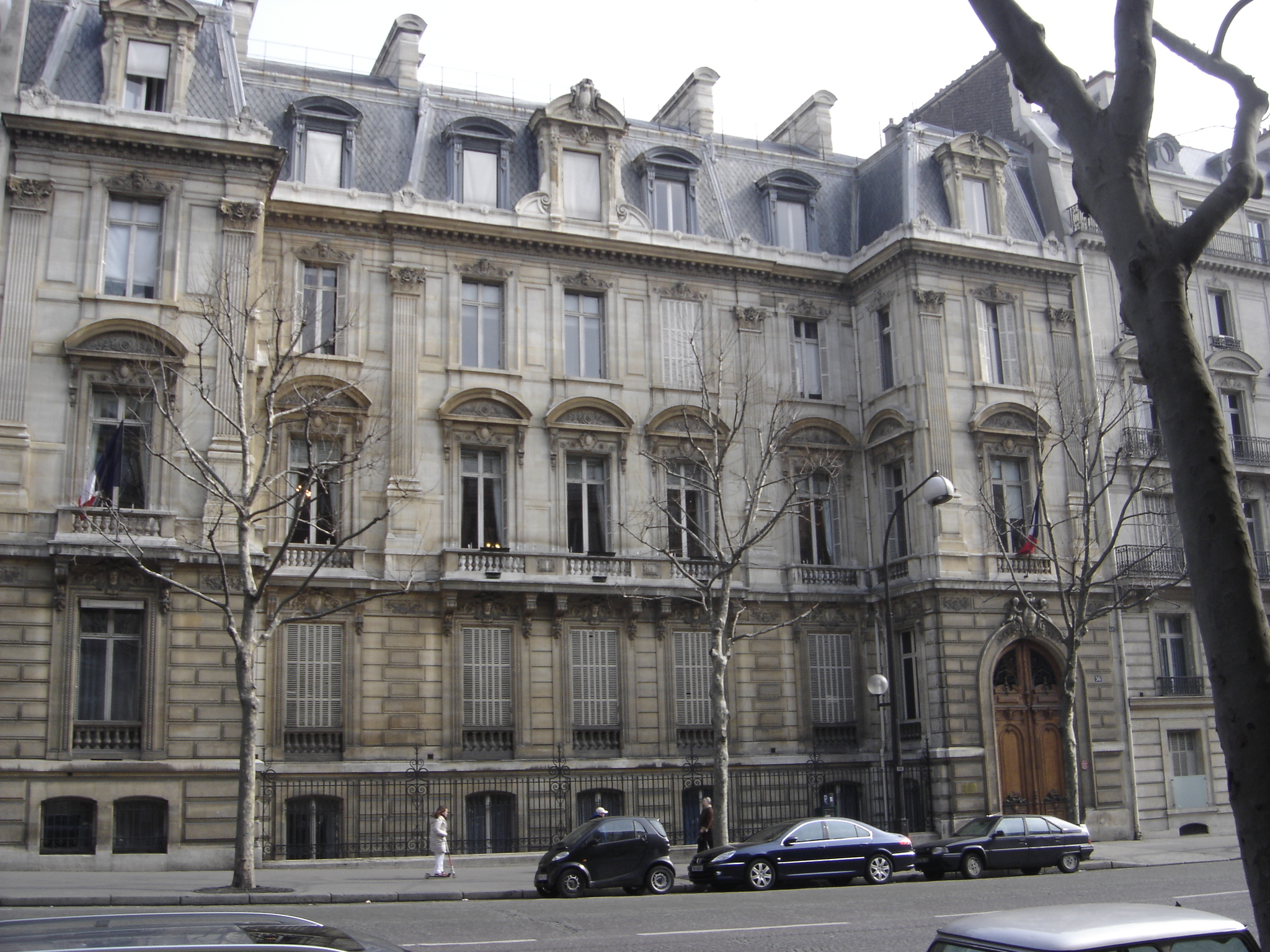
Paris townhouse of Jean-François Cail, today Mairie du 8ieme arrondissement.

Jean-François Cail (8 February 1804 – 22 May 1871) was a French entrepreneur and industrialist who was a key figure in French industrialization.

== Life ==
=== Childhood ===
Jean-François Cail was born the third of eight children on 8 February 1804. He was the son of Charles Cail (1777–1854), a wheelwright, and his wife, Marie Pinpin (1777–1839). The family had a small cottage in Chef-Boutonne, in Deux-Sèvres (16).

=== Partnership with Charles Derosne ===
Jean-François Cail left home in 1816 to start an apprenticeship as a boilermaker. He ended up in the company of Charles Derosne, a manufacturing chemist involved in creating distillation equipment. Getting on well they founded the company Derosne & Cail in 1826. The company specialised in making alcohol and confectionery from sugar beet, and building machines to sell for others to follow the process. This included one of the world's first machines to make children's confectionery.

In 1844 the company planned to expand into the manufacture of steam locomotives and in 1845 supplied seven or eight locomotives to Chemin de Fer de Nord, followed by two locomotives and wagons for Chemin de Fer de Sceaux in 1846. On 24 October 1846, Cail obtained a licence to copy the patents of Thomas Russell Crampton and began manufacturing Crampton locomotives as well. He was one of the first railway constructors in France.

Derosne died on 21 September 1846 and the company got into great trouble because of the 1848 revolution.

=== Société J. F. Cail & Cie ===
On 6 June 1850 Cail founded the new company Société J. F. Cail & Cie. It continued to be successful in locomotives and expanded to become an international company, branching especially into engineered structures.

=== Private life ===
Having become a wealthy man, Mr. Cail built a luxurious townhouse in Paris that is used today by the city government as town hall of the 8th arrondissement.

He is buried in an elaborate and huge tomb in Pere Lachaise cemetery in Paris. The tomb lies towards the north-east at the junction of two paths.

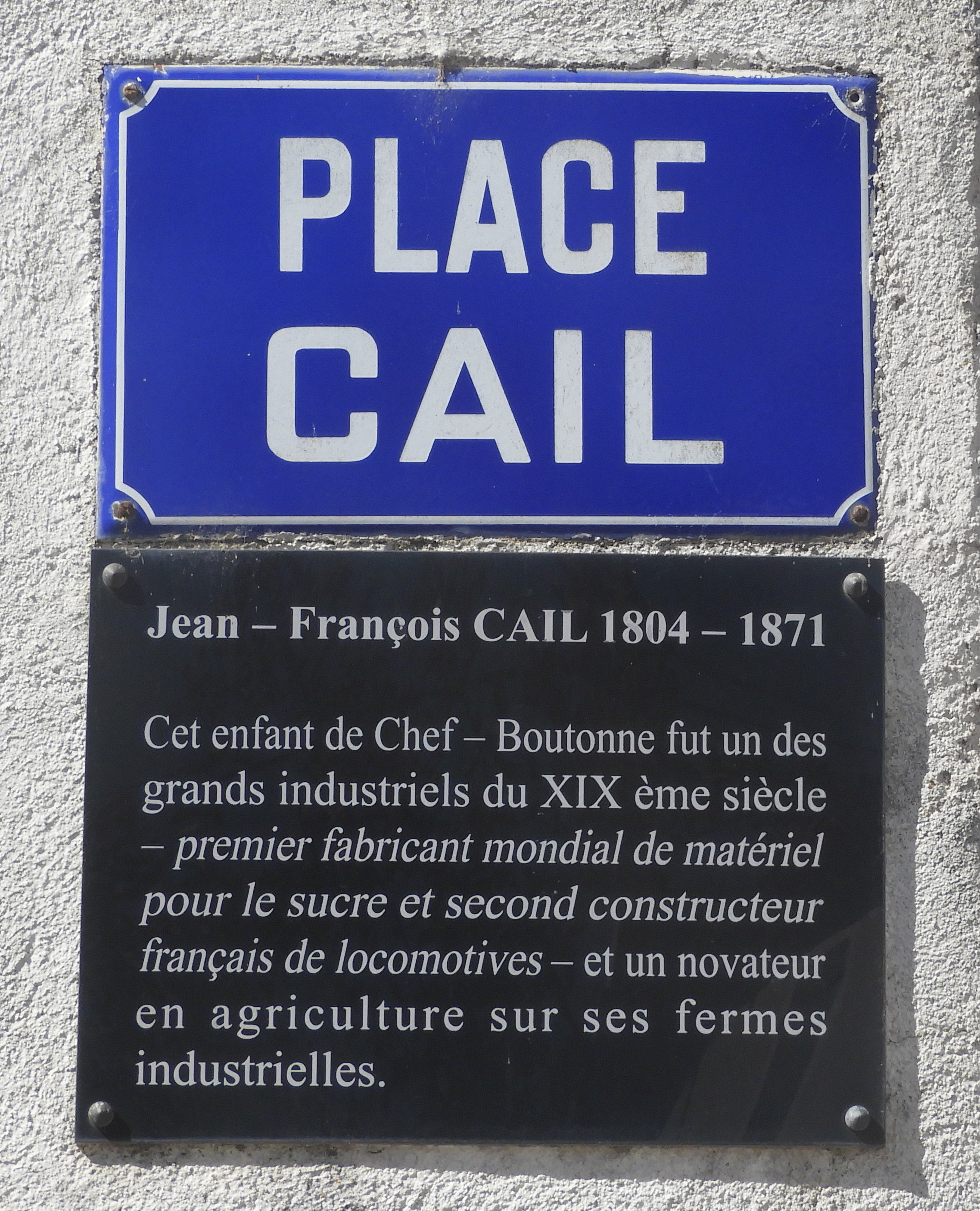
Street sign and commemorative notice, Place Cail, Chef-Boutonne

== Recognition ==
The main square of his home town Chef-Boutonne is named Place Cail. A street in Paris is also named after him: Rue Cail.

Additionally, his name is among the 72 names engraved on the Eiffel Tower by Gustave Eiffel, in recognition of his contributions to the project.
