= Armand Séguin =

French chemist and physiologist (1767–1835)

Armand Jean François Séguin or Segouin (21 March 1767 – 24 January 1835) was a French chemist and physiologist who discovered a faster and cheaper process for tanning leather. As a result, he became immensely rich through the supply of leather to Napoleon's armies. He was born on March 21, 1767, in Paris and died on January 23, 1835.

== Scientific career ==
From 1789 he was involved in several important areas of scientific research: the composition of water, the physiology of respiration and perspiration, and in determining techniques for the fusion and analysis of platinum.

Armand Seguin was a collaborator and human guinea pig with Antoine Lavoisier in his experiments on animal respiration.

Lavoisier had an interest in the purification of platinum and its use in making vessels for use in chemical research. In 1790 presented a paper Observations on Platinum to the Académie des Sciences with which he showed some examples of the work of Marc Etienne Janety, the Royal Goldsmith to Louis XVI who had found himself left with a large stock of platinum when the French Revolution reduced the demand.

Lavoisier was otherwise occupied and passed the research project to Seguin. James Hall the Scottish geologist records visiting Lavoisier in Paris in 1791:

Went with M. Seguin to Jannetti rue de l’arbre sec. He works in Platina. I bespoke a little spoon for the blow pipe and & cup with some wire of that metal. M. S told me that as prepared the metal does not stand the action of pure caustic alkali when urged by a great heat, for by this means it becomes porous and lets the alkali through by acting as it is supposed upon the arsenic which has not been thoroughly driven off. Yet in this state it will answer many purposes.

— J A Chaldecott, Ann. Sci. 1968, 24, 21-52, National Library of Scotland MS 6332, ff 49-50.

Seguin and Lavoisier attempted to solve the problem of purification and approached Josiah Wedgwood for an advice on suitable refractory, he was unable to help and passed on the request to Joseph Priestley who said he considered magnesia to be the most likely substance to withstand such intense heats. In the end their attempt failed and it was left to Jannetty to solve and to sell his stock of platinum.

From 1790 until his death Seguin was associated with the editorial board of the scientific journal Annales de chimie et de physique, which is still published, now named Annales de chimie et de physique. After Lavoisier's execution in 1794 Seguin started a collaboration with Lavoisier's widow, Marie-Anne Pierrette Paulze, to publish a memoir of her husband. This ended abruptly when, according to Madame Lavoisier, Seguin gave too much importance to his own collaboration with the father of modern chemistry and also refused to publicly condemn the murderers of Lavoisier.

In 1802, Armand Séguin worked with Bernard Courtois at the École Polytechnique on the study of opium. Together they isolated morphine, the first known alkaloid, from opium. Séguin presented his first memoir on opium to the French Institute in 1804 but failed to mention Coutois' contribution.

It was his meticulous chemical research into the process of tanning that shaped his later life.

Previous to the experiments of Seguin, the process of tanning was an operation of much time and trouble, even years were necessary to bring the hide to a state of leather. The revolution this chemist has brought about in this art enables the tanner to complete his formerly arduous process in the short space of a few days, whilst the leather is superior in quality to that made after the old method.

— William B. Johnson, History of the Progress and Present State of Animal Chemistry, Vol 1.

== Tanning ==
Seguin built a tanning factory on the Île de Sèvres, granted to him by the Republic, and later known as the Île Seguin in the Seine at Boulogne-Billancourt, near Paris. He became extremely rich by becoming the supplier of Bonaparte's army and joined the merchants responsible for raising funds for the French Treasury. His daughter Zoe later sold the Île Seguin and his family lived for several generations off his colossal fortune.

== Family ==
Séguin was the son of Hector Hyacinte Ségouin (1731 - ) a Notary at Chartres and Marie Anne Madeleine Chancerel.

In Paris Séguin's house in the rue d’Anjou adjoined that of Jacques Collard (1758-1838) the grandfather of Marie-Fortunée Lafarge and she recounts her memories of him and his children.

M. Séguin was a very obscure, and very poor chemist, when he discovered, at the moment when the Republic needed equipments for its army, the method of tanning leather ... They held out the prospect of a fortune if successful and of the guillotine in case of failure. M. Séguin trusted to his star, and fortune became his slave.

He married a “noble, but poor girl”, Marie Emilie Félicité Raffard de Marcilly (1773-1862) the daughter of Hyppolite Félicité Raffard de Marcilly a Notary in Alençon and Gabrielle Russon. They had two children: Abel - Armand Félix Abel Séguin (1799-1873) and Zoé - Félicité Marie Zoé Séguin. Madame Lafarge says the children of the two families “formed one of those close relationships which endure through life with all their radiant reminiscences”.

In later life Séguin became increasingly eccentric. Among others, he developed a passion for horses and made the acquaintance of Adam Elmore, an English horse-breeder who kept stables near Hyde Park.

M. Elmore had no station in society, and little fortune; but the acutest horse-jockey could not deceive him in the age or qualities of a horse. He was an inestimable guide in procuring a stud, a redoubtable enemy against roguish dealers, and M. Séguin made him his son-in-law – from economy. Personally M. Elmore was not handsome; he had carroty locks, and did not understand two words of French; but he was a heretic, and promised to be converted. – Mlle. Zoe accepted him to secure Heaven and a husband.

The links with the Elmore family continued, Abel married Louisa Elmore (a cousin of Adam?), and their son George Able Séguin married Adam's great-niece Lydia Elmore.

Armand Séguin (1869-1903), a painter of the Pont-Aven School, was one of Séguin’s great-grandchildren.
