= Voiture =

Voiture (French, 'car') may refer to:

- Vincent Voiture (1597–1648) French poet
- 333508 Voiture, an asteroid

== See also ==
- Car (disambiguation)
- Passenger car (disambiguation)
- Voiturette (disambiguation)
- Eurofima coach, or Voiture Standard Européenne, a passenger rail car
- Voiture État, passenger rail car
- Voiture État à 2 étages, passenger rail car
- Voiture de banlieue à 2 niveaux, passenger rail car
- Bugatti La Voiture Noire, a prototype show car concept automobile
