= Passenger car (disambiguation) =

A passenger car is an automobile as opposed to a truck.

Passenger car may also refer to:

- Passenger car (Ferris wheel), a compartment for carrying passengers
- Passenger railroad car, railway rolling stock for carrying passengers

== See also ==
- Car (disambiguation)
- Sedan (disambiguation)
- Voiture (disambiguation)
- Automobile (disambiguation)
