= Voiturette (disambiguation) =

A voiturette is a small car.

Voiturette may also refer to:

- Léon Bollée Voiturette (1895; also "Hurtu Voiturette"), the first vehicle named "Voiturette", and first vehicle of Léon Bollée
- Renault Voiturette (1898), an early car, the first vehicle of Renault
- Voiturette (racing class), a race car class below pre-WWII Grand Prix class and pre-WWII Grand Touring class; the predecessor of Formula Two

== See also ==
- American Voiturette Company, a U.S. carmaker
- Voiture (disambiguation)
