= Voiture État à 2 étages =

Voiture État à deux étages
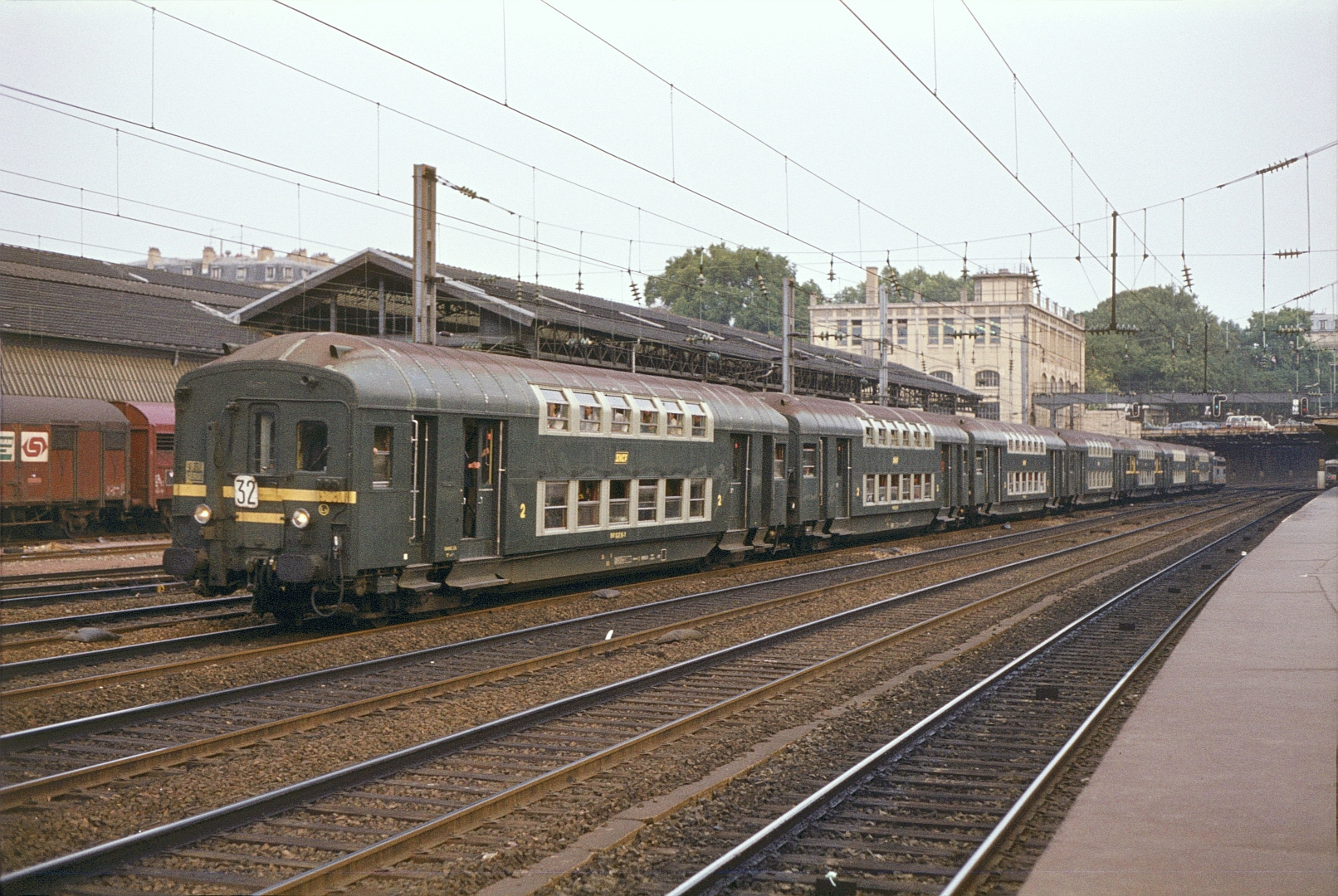
- A push-pull train made of Voiture État à 2 étages at Pont-Cardinet in 1982
- Manufacturer: Entreprises Industrielles Charentaises, Carel et Fouché
- Constructed: 1933–1934
- Number built: 50
- Operators: État; SNCF

Specifications
- Maximum speed: 120 km/h (75 mph)

The Voiture État à deux étages, were a class of double-deck carriages built for Paris suburban services of the French Chemin de fer de l'État.

== Origin ==
The suburbs of Paris, having experienced a huge expansion at the beginning of the 20th century, the railway companies serving the Île-de-France region were faced with an increasing number of passengers travelling greater distances. The Chemin de Fer de l'Ouest's old carriages were no longer adequate and the Chemin de fer de l'État decided to design a new style of passenger car, capable of carrying passengers on two levels. The aim was to avoid increasing the length of trains whilst increasing capacity.

== Design ==
The design was revolutionary for its use of aluminium as well as steel to reduce weight. Although unpowered, each rake of seven cars had a driving trailer at one end and were pushed and pulled by a steam locomotive, such as the 141 TC Ouest and 141 TD Ouest. The cars possessed two vestibules, each with two sets of doors and stairs to allow passage from one deck to the next. The upper deck had rows of five seats whilst the lower deck had rows of four as they had to fit between the frames. The driving trailers allowed the driver to control the steam engine from the driving cab in the opposite end carriage while the locomotive was pushing, using controls actuated by compressed air pipes running through the train.

== Service ==
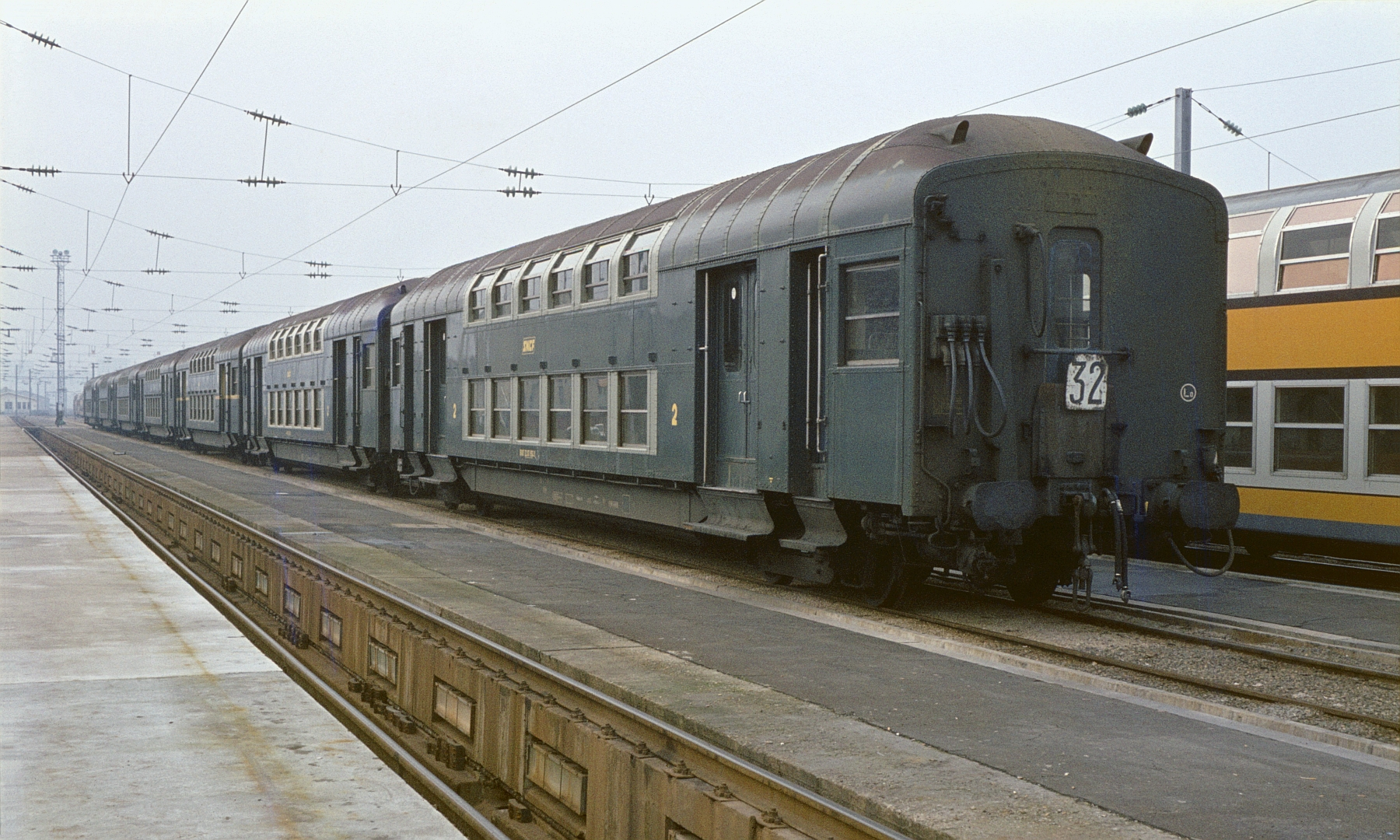
A 7-car consist parked alongside new VB2N

The first ten carriages were delivered by Brissonneau et Lotz, now part of Alstom, in 1933. The Voiture État à 2 étages were used as permanently coupled sets of carriages and used for réversibilité (push-pull operation), driving the train from the end passenger car and the steam locomotive pushing, on the Réseau Saint-Lazare. They often operated once in the morning, taking commuters to work, and once in the evening, returning them back home. They were also briefly used on the Réseau Montparnasse in shorter sets of six cars.

Fifty cars were built, which accommodated the increasing suburban traffic from the beginning of the 20th century. They were supplemented by 380 Talbot passenger cars and 200 Standard EMUs. The last of the class were only withdrawn in 1984, after introduction of the VB2N in 1975.

== Carriages in preservation ==
Several Voiture État à 2 étages have been preserved:

- Train à Vapeur de Touraine (TVT)
- Écomusée d'Alsace
- formerly on the Chemin de fer de la Seudre

== See also ==
- Voiture État
- Voiture de banlieue à 2 niveaux
