= ÖBB Long Schlieren =

Class of push-pull railway carriage

Long Schlieren
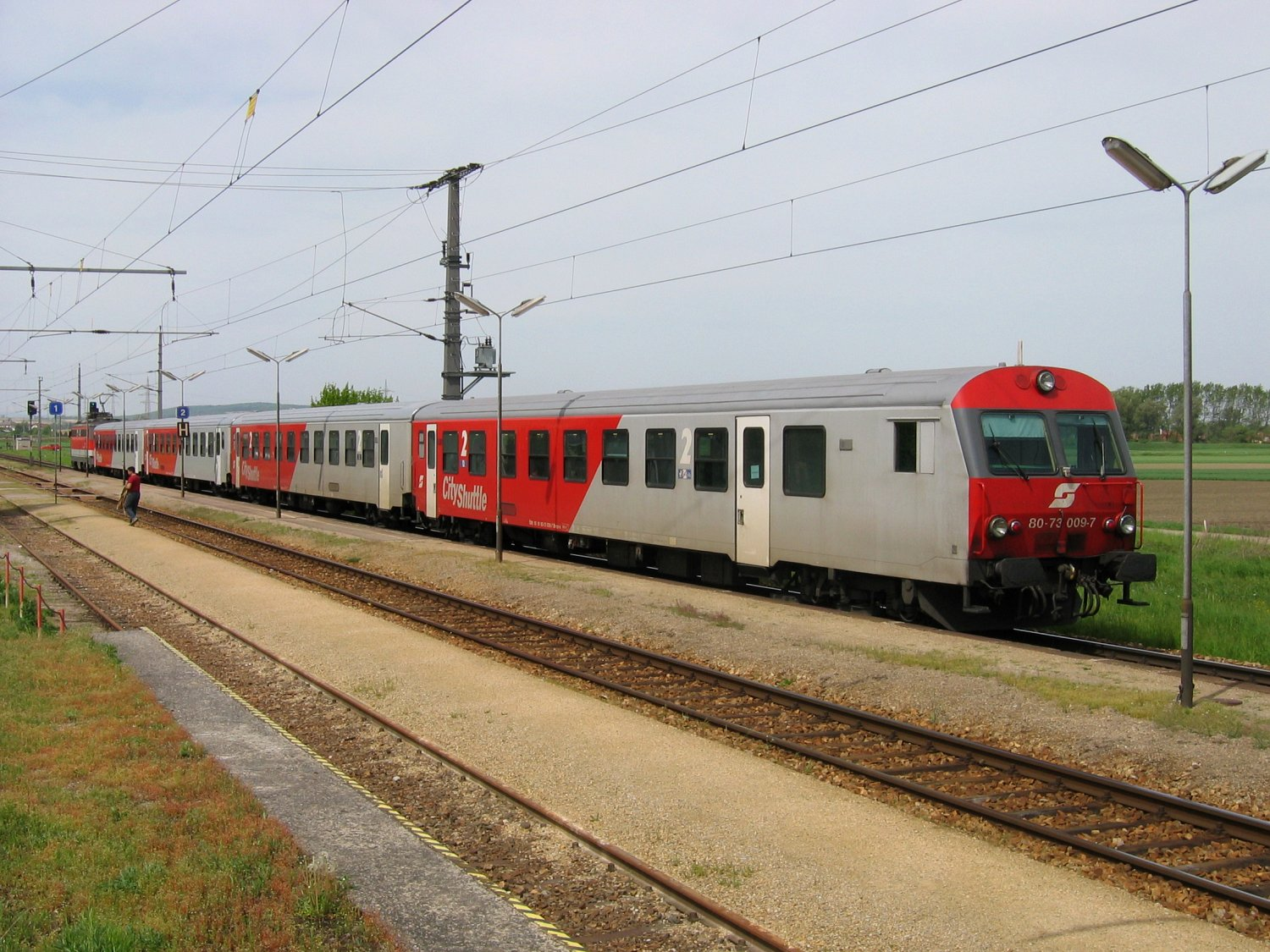
- Manufacturers: Simmering-Graz-Pauker, Jenbacher
- Constructed: 1980-1989
- Retired: Since 2016
- Number built: 566 standard carriages, 152 cab cars
- Design code: Current: Bmpz-l; Bmpz-s (cab car); Bmpvz-l (bicycle car); As built: Ampz (first class); ABmpz (first/second class); Bmpz (second class); BDmpsz (baggage combine car); BRmpz (second class/buffet); WRmz (dining car)

The Long Schlieren, currently branded as the CityShuttle, is a class of push-pull railway carriage widely used on the Austrian Federal Railways. Introduced in 1980 as ÖBB's flagship long-distance carriage, all units were rebuilt and cascaded down to regional and commuter service between 1995 and 2006, as part of the company's Corporate Redesign 2000 program.

== History ==
In 1980, the Austrian Railways commissioned an updated version of their existing Schlieren-type carriages, built according to the same basic design principles (lightweight, small diameter wheels and low floor) but incorporating modern features such as inward-opening doors, half-opening windows, a UIC-standard car body length of 26.4 m (86 ft 7 in) (hence the name), and a higher design speed of 160 km/h (99 mph). Originally featuring two-class accommodation, with some units configured as second class buffet cars, full dining cars, or second-class baggage combine cars, the coaches were used on intercity and regional express services within Austria and into Germany and Switzerland. There were 18 rows of back-to-back seats in first class and 20 in second, with ample space between seatbacks for hand luggage.

The first combine car (BDmpsz), number 82-75 000-2, was completed by Jenbacher on 19 April 1982 and assigned to trains running from Vienna Westbahnhof. The carriages had 40 seats, a guard compartment and a luggage compartment with a 4.3 tonne maximum capacity. Unlike the original Schlieren stock, the baggage compartment had a side corridor, removing the need for it to be at the end of the consist.

The first bistro carriage (BRmpz, 85-75 000-9) entered service on the Westbahn on April 22nd of that year. It had 41 total seats, of which 29 were normally part of the dining area with the other 12 being sold as second-class seats; these seats could also be converted to dining booths as needed by placing portable tables between them. Ten of these were later converted into full dining cars.

As part of their transfer to regional duties in the 1990s, combine and dining cars were converted into both cab cars and standard second-class carriages, with all units receiving cables for multiple-unit working, as well as receiving a repaint.

The 21-73.8 series carriages were rebuilt from 29-75 series first-class carriages, being recognisable as such by only having three bays of four seats in the middle of the coach, no aisle seats in the first two rows, and wider window spacing than carriages originally built as second class:

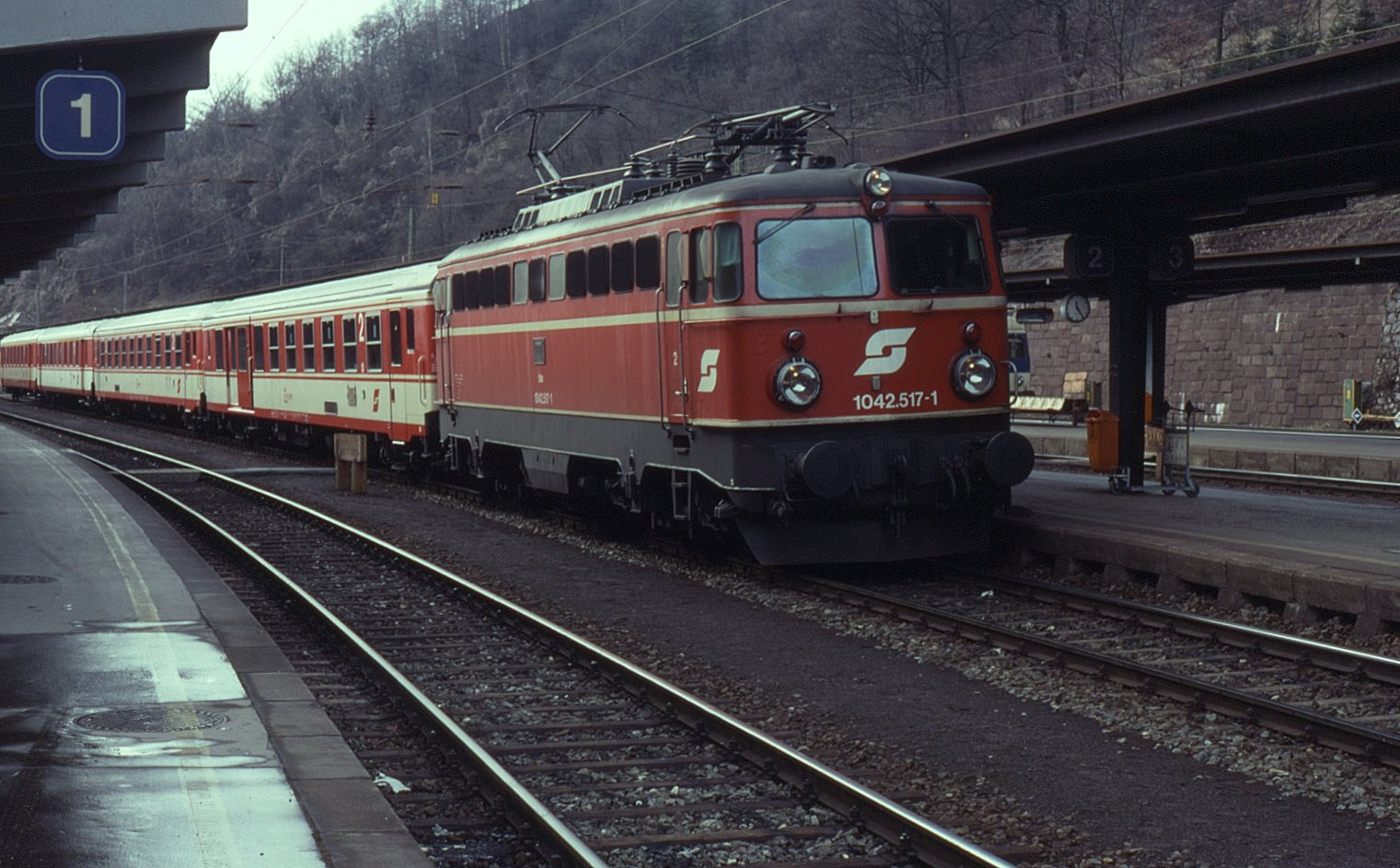
Regional train with two Long Schlieren coaches in original "Jaffa" livery followed by original Schlieren stock

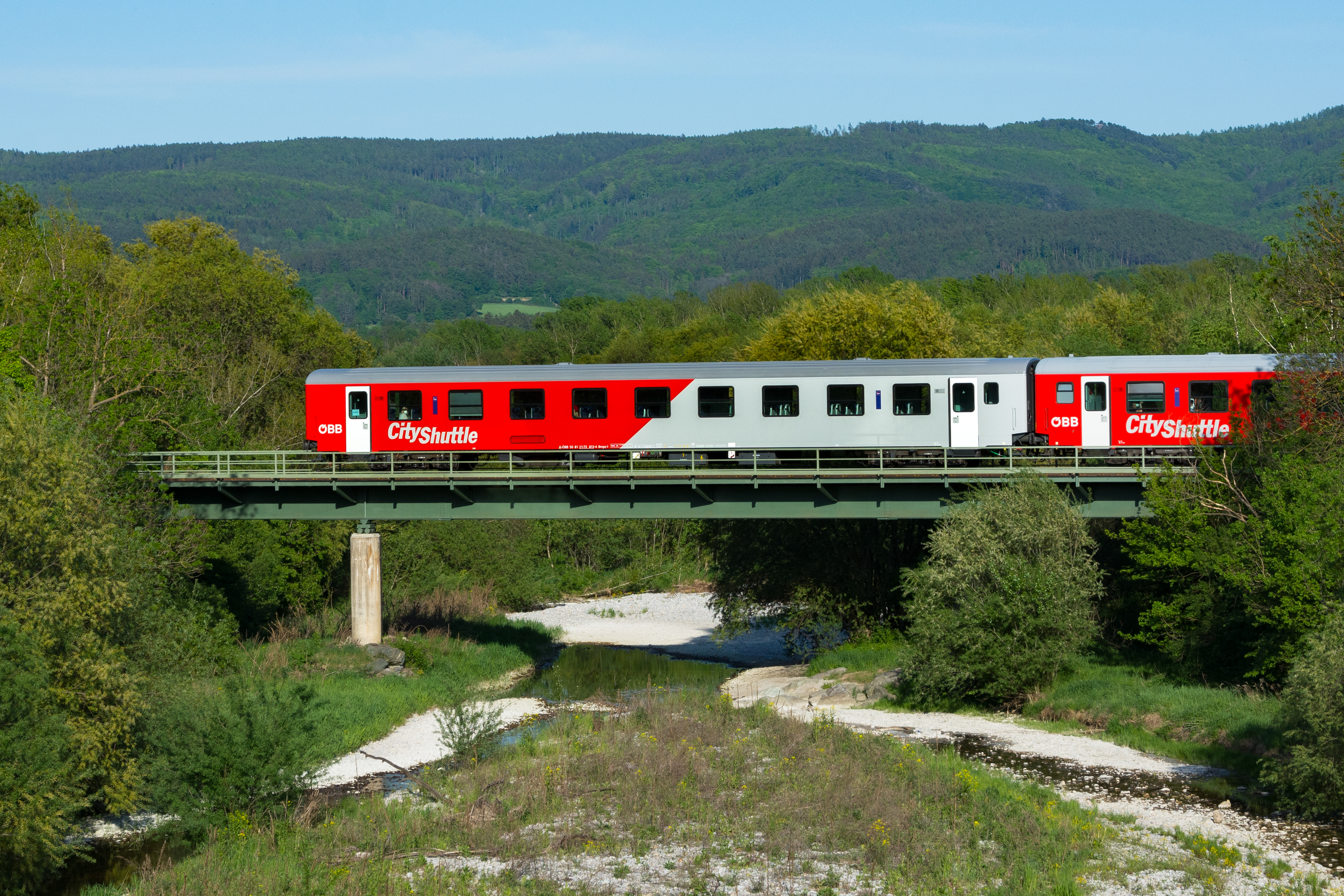
21-73 813-4

Whilst ten former first/second class combined carriages were slated for conversion to an all-second-class layout, only units 29-75 101 and 104 were converted in the end, receiving the new fleet numbers 21-73 901 and 902. The other eight retained a first-class compartment, receiving fleet numbers in the 39-73 1xx series, and were originally used on trains from Salzburg to Wörgl. In 2012, all such carriages were declassified, equipped with a 24-place bicycle compartment, and redesignated fleet numbers 84-73 000 through 009. These carriages were reconfigured to a mostly airline-style seat layout, increasing the total number of seat rows to 22, but the capacity remains the same at 80 due to the missing aisle seats at each end. Since rebuilding, each carriage has only one toilet, with the ski or bicycle compartment taking up the space the second formerly occupied.

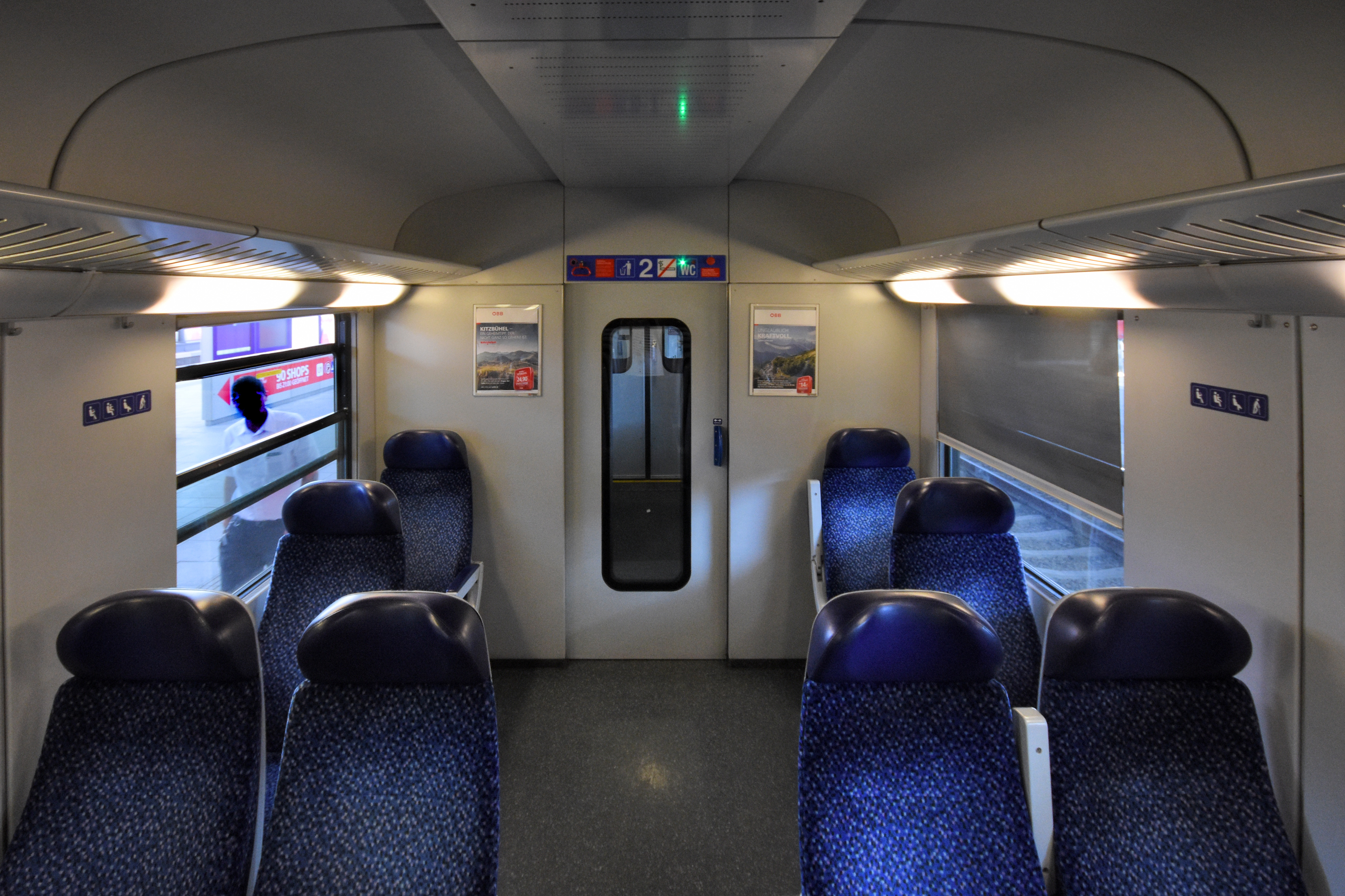
First rows without aisle seats

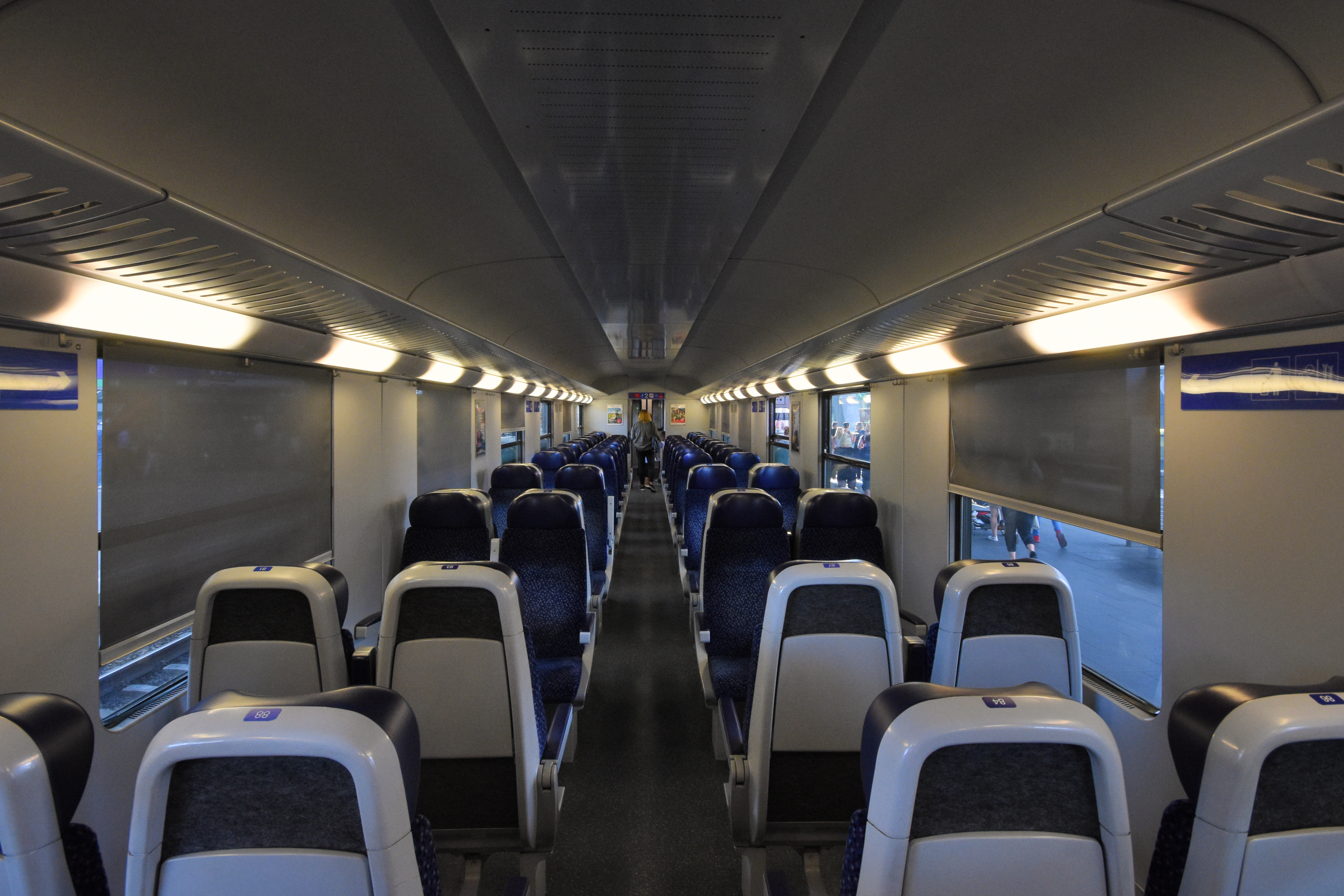
Bays of four seats

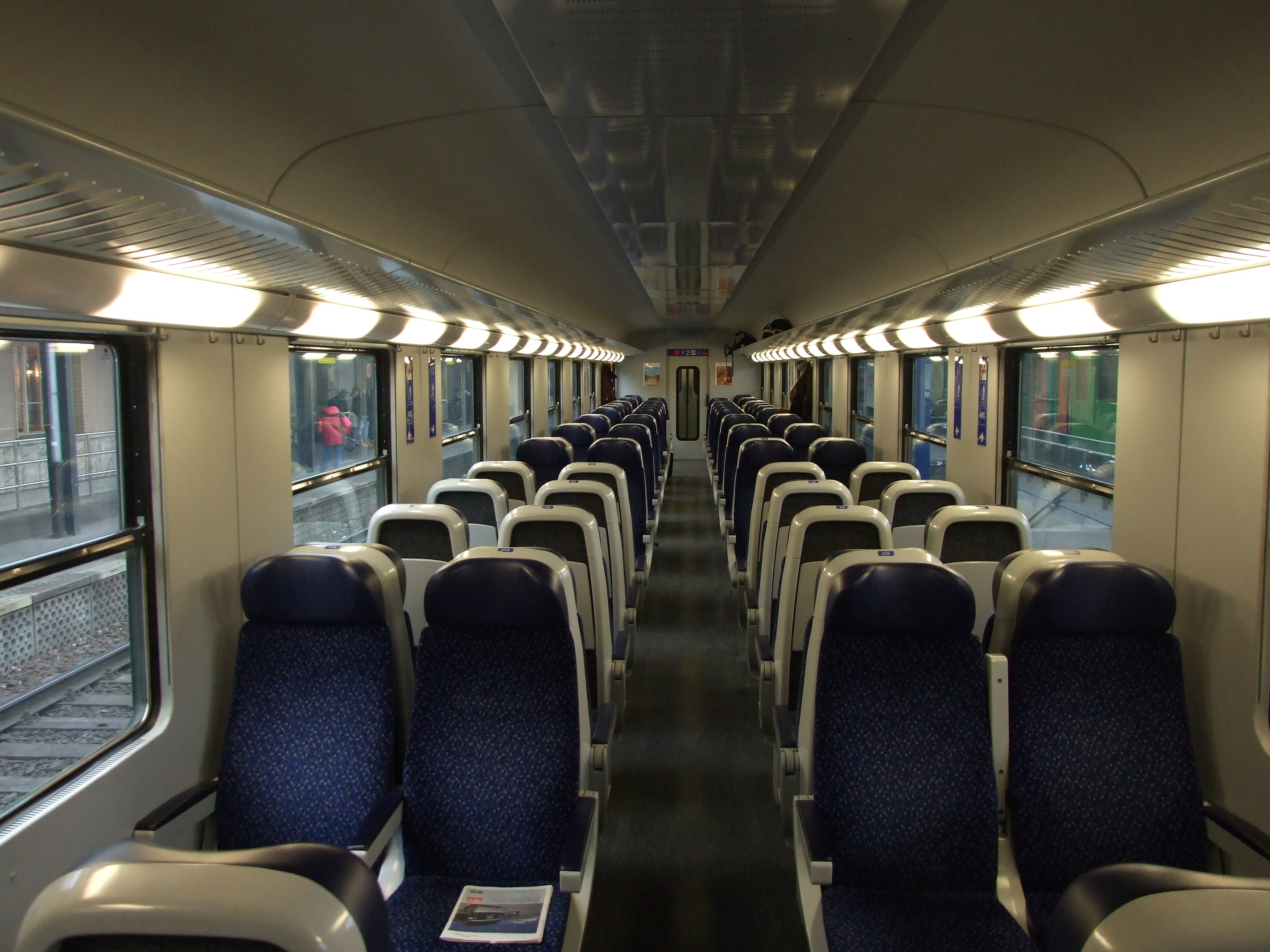
CityShuttle interior with new seat fabric (Bmpz-l)

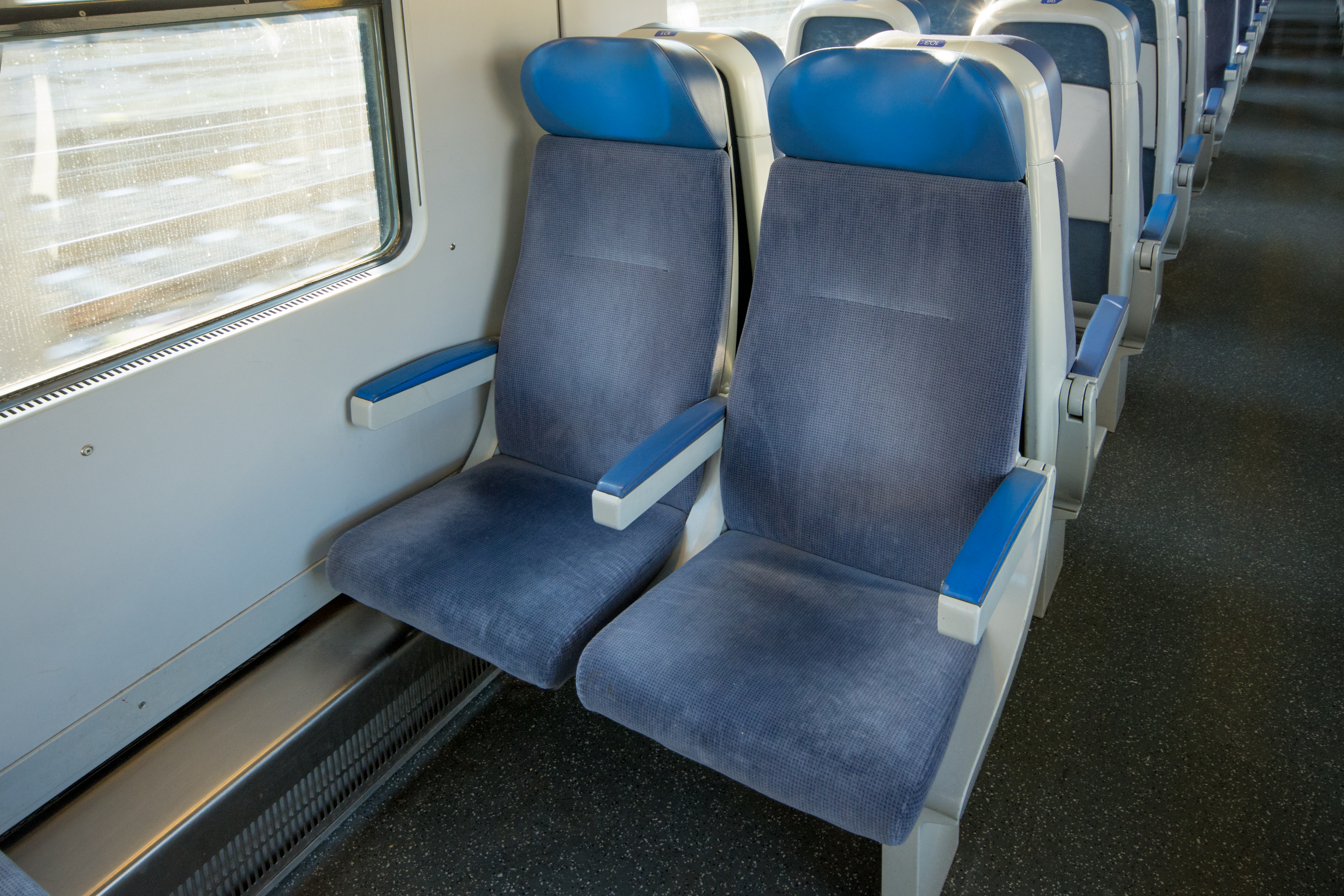
Old seat fabric in a Bmpz-l

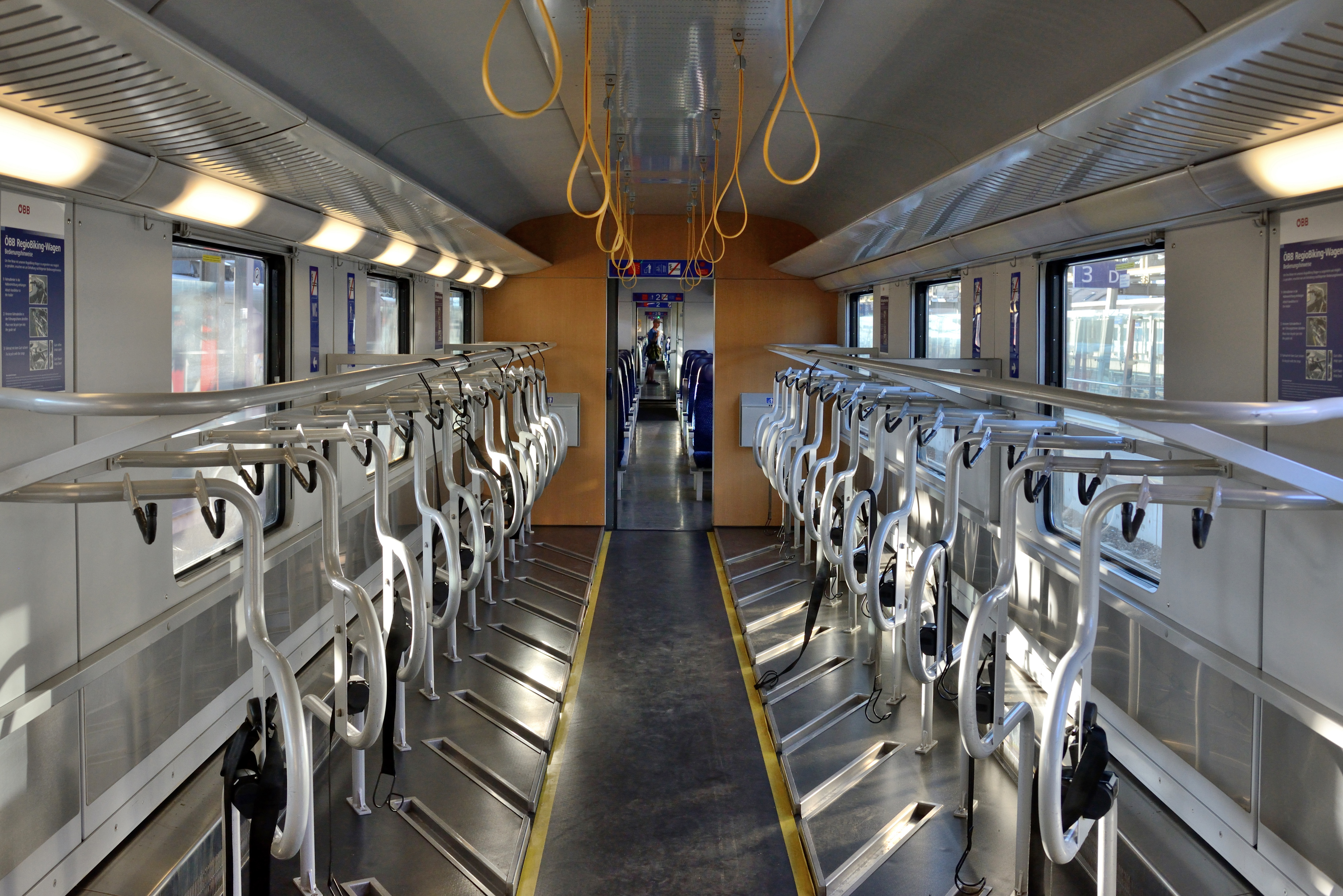
Bmpvz-l bike racks

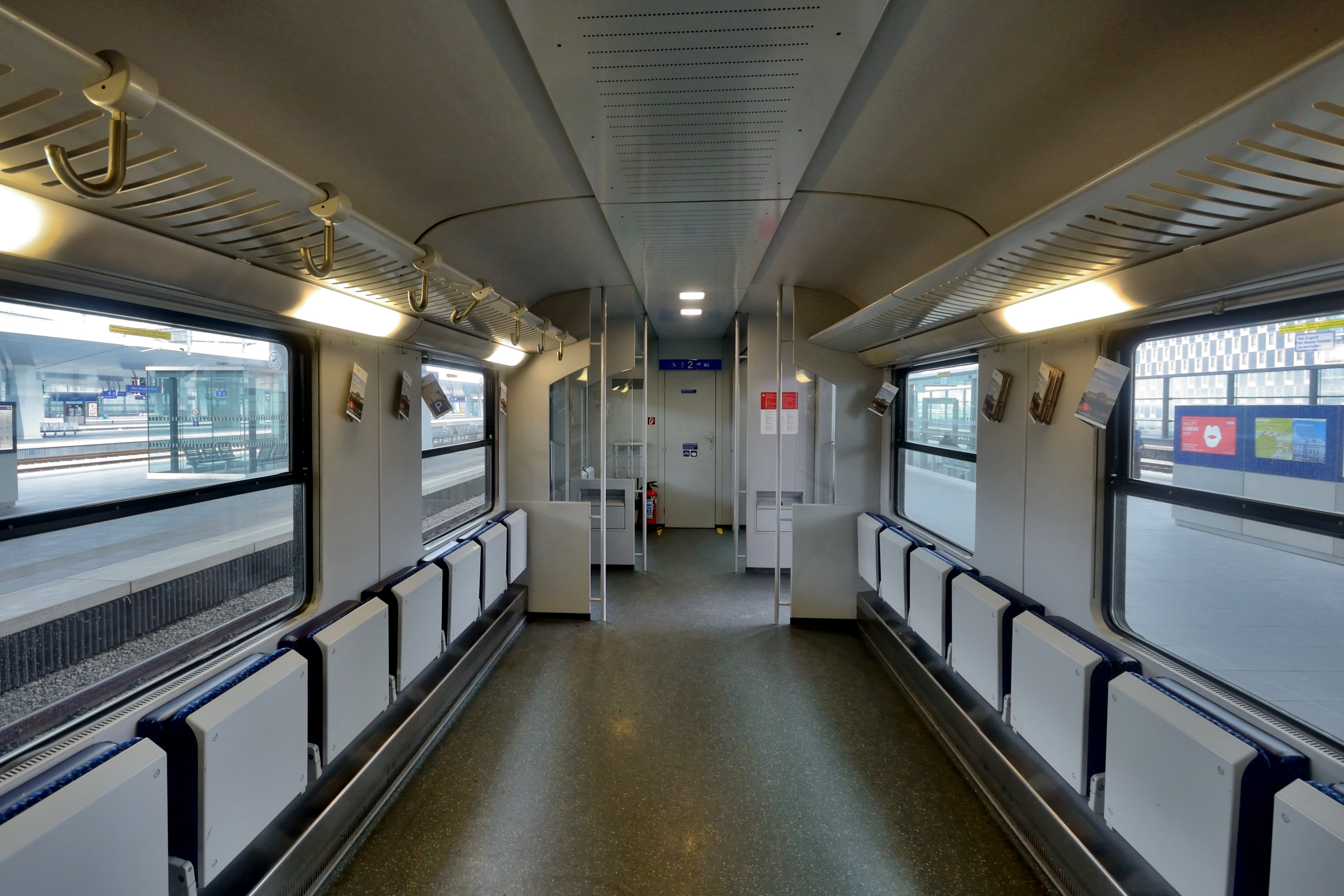
Cab car multipurpose storage area with jump seats (Bmpz-s)

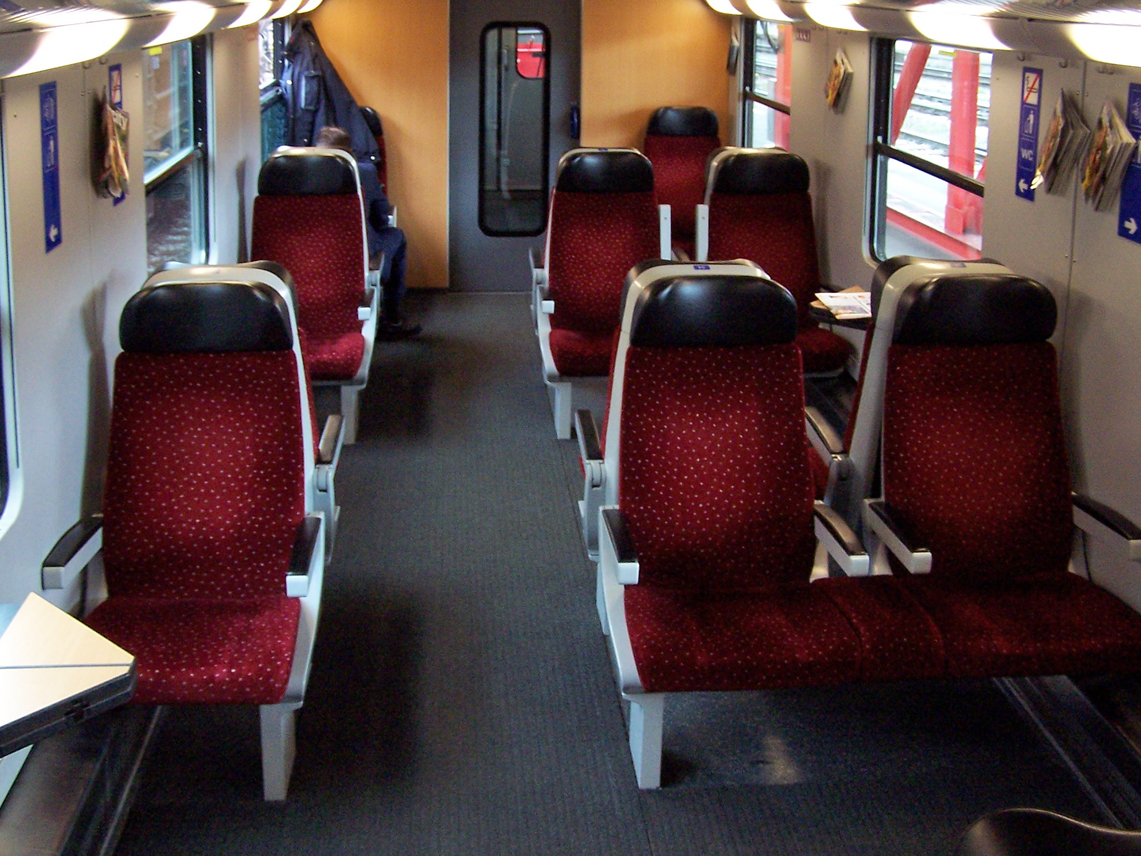
ABmpz-l regional first-class accommodation (removed 2012)

== Cab cars ==
=== Rebuilding ===
In the mid 1990s, 152 intermediate carriages were rebuilt into cab cars (Bmpz-s) at the ÖBB Technical Services Floridsdorf and St. Polten workshops:

- 102 units from series 82-75 (Baggage combine car)
- 15 units from series 85-75 (Buffet car/Partial dining car)
- 10 units from series 88-75 (Dining car)
- 25 units from series 20-75 (2nd class carriage)

Prototype 82-75 000-0 was the first to be converted in 1995 at St. Polten. It was the OBB's first loco-hauled cab car of any kind and the first to be later upgraded to CityShuttle specifications, redesignated Bmpz-s 80-73. Today it bears the number 80-73 006-3. After carriages 80-75 000 to 02 (originally series 82-75 baggage combine cars) rolled out of St. Polten in 1996 and 1997, conversion efforts shifted to the 85-75 partial dining cars, which were renumbered 80-75 075 to 083. The Floridsdorf works began converting carriages slightly later and delivered its first cab car in 1997, this time in CityShuttle livery with the number 80-73 095-6 (formerly dining car 88-75). The remaining dining cars, receiving the numbers 090 to 099, were also converted at Floridsdorf and differ from other cab cars in having different window spacing and different floor reinforcement for the now-removed kitchen equipment. Conversion of the 85-75 partial dining cars also restarted at Floridsdorf around this time, getting the new numbers 084 to 089.
