= Push–pull train =

Train with a locomotive on one end and a control car on another

A typical push–pull train consists of one locomotive at one end of the train with a control car with duplicate controls on the other end that can be used when pushing.

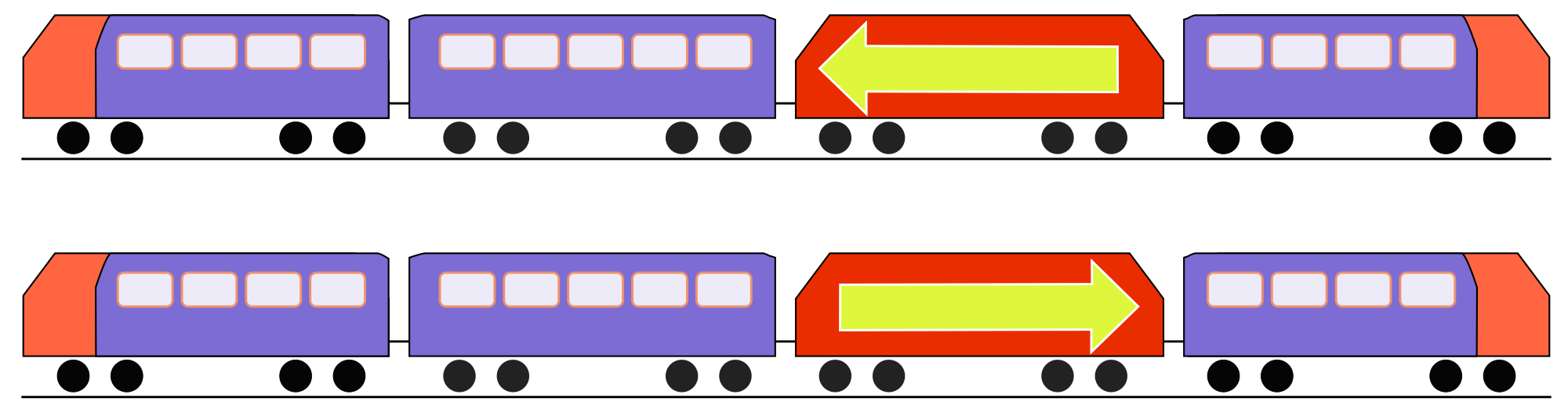
A push–pull train may also have two control cars on either end with the locomotive in the middle.

Push–pull is a configuration for locomotive-hauled passenger trains, usually having a locomotive on one end and an unpowered control car on another, connected via some form of remote control, such as multiple-unit train control.

This formation meant that the locomotive would not have to run-around at the end of a journey before returning.

The trains were also historically known as "motor trains" or "railmotors", but the term "railmotor" is now used to refer to trains where the locomotive was integrated into a coach. In the UK and some other parts of Europe, the control car is referred to as a driving trailer (or driving van trailer/DVT where there is no passenger accommodation); in the US and Canada, they are called cab cars and in Australia, they are called driving trailers.

== Train formation ==
=== Locomotive at one end ===
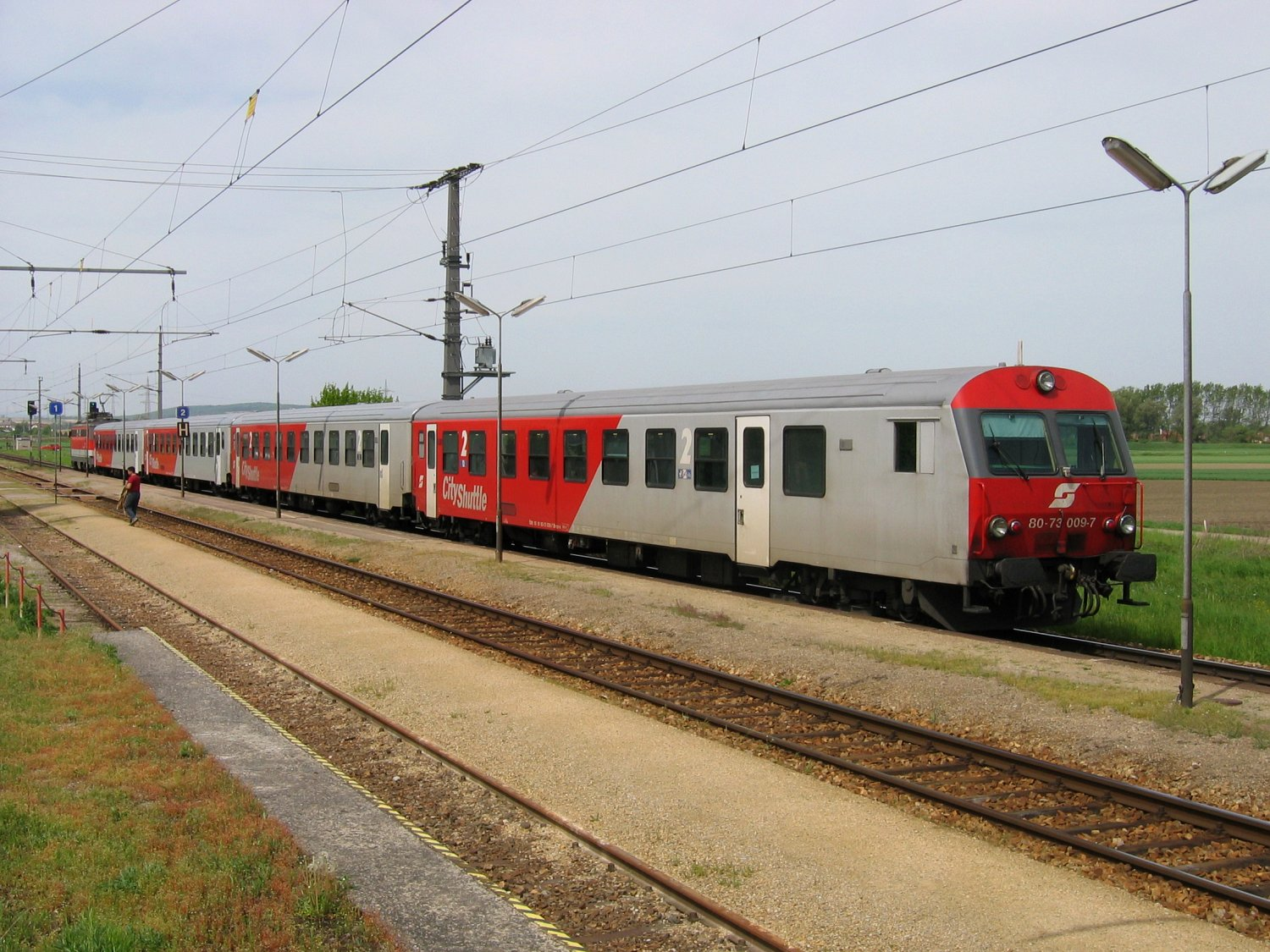
CityShuttle push–pull train in Austria (2004); note locomotive at the rear of the train.

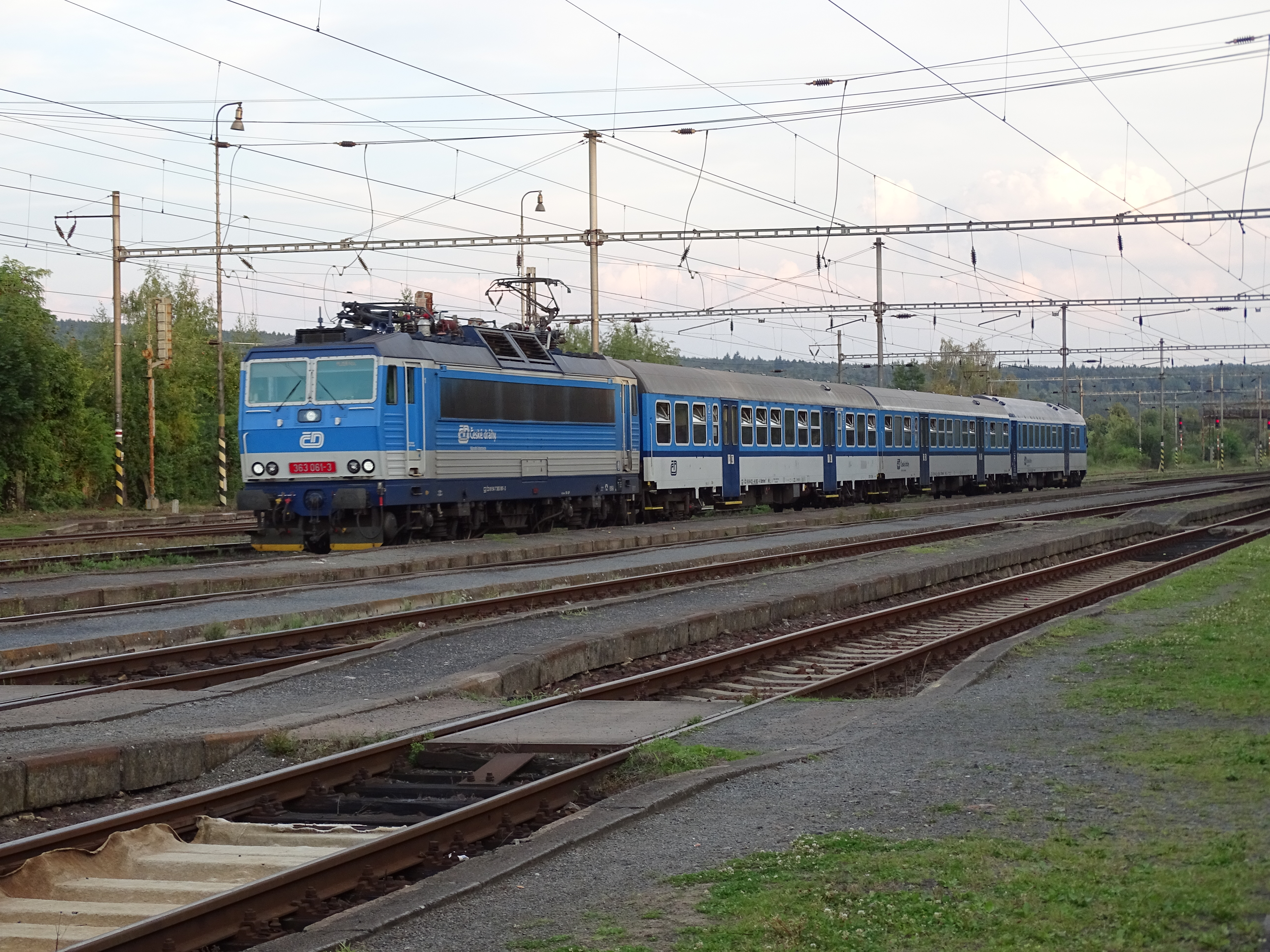
Push–pull train in the Czech Republic (2016); note control car at the rear of the train.

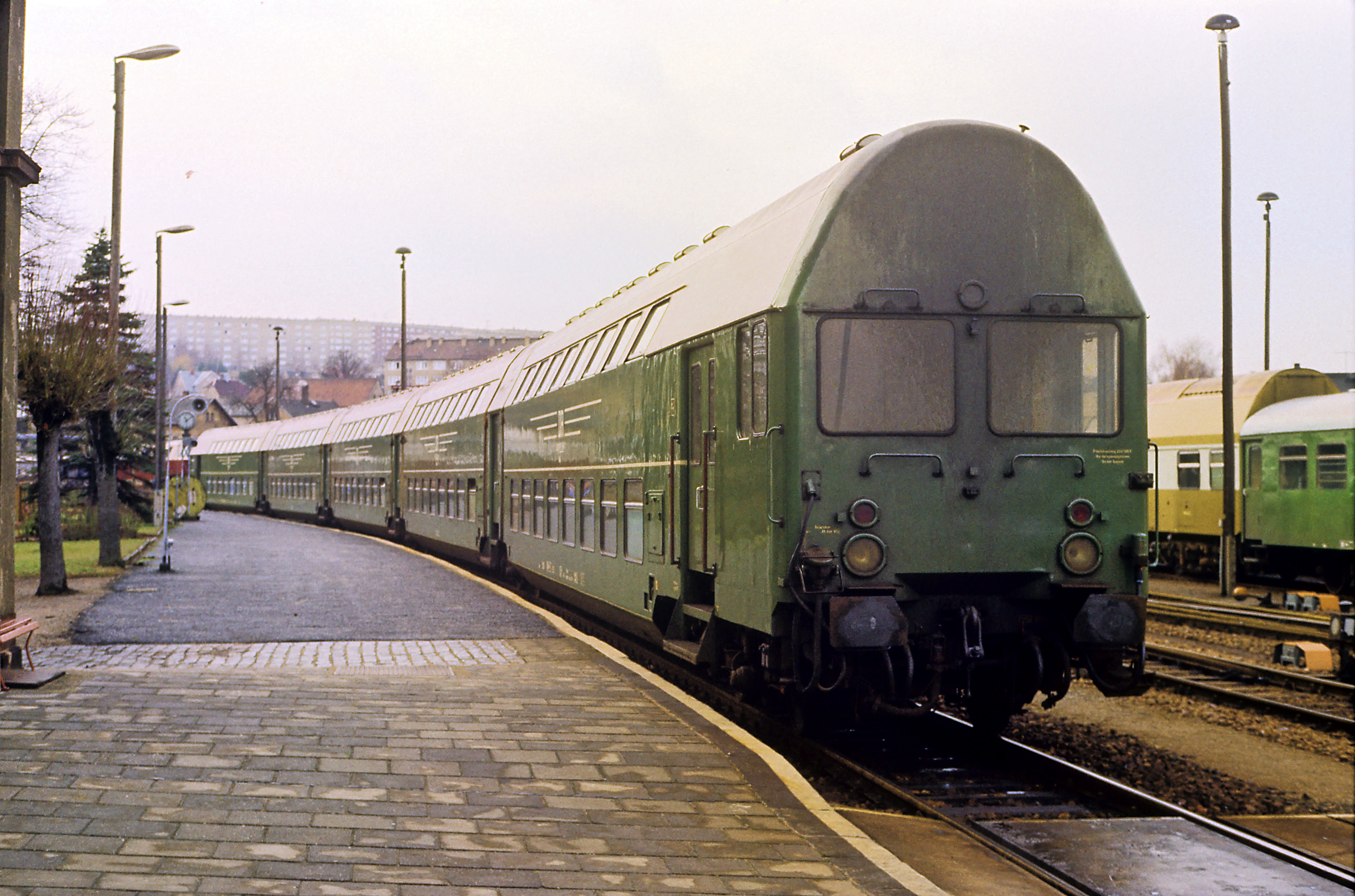
Former Push–pull train of Deutsche Reichsbahn (control car out of function) after the unification of Germany

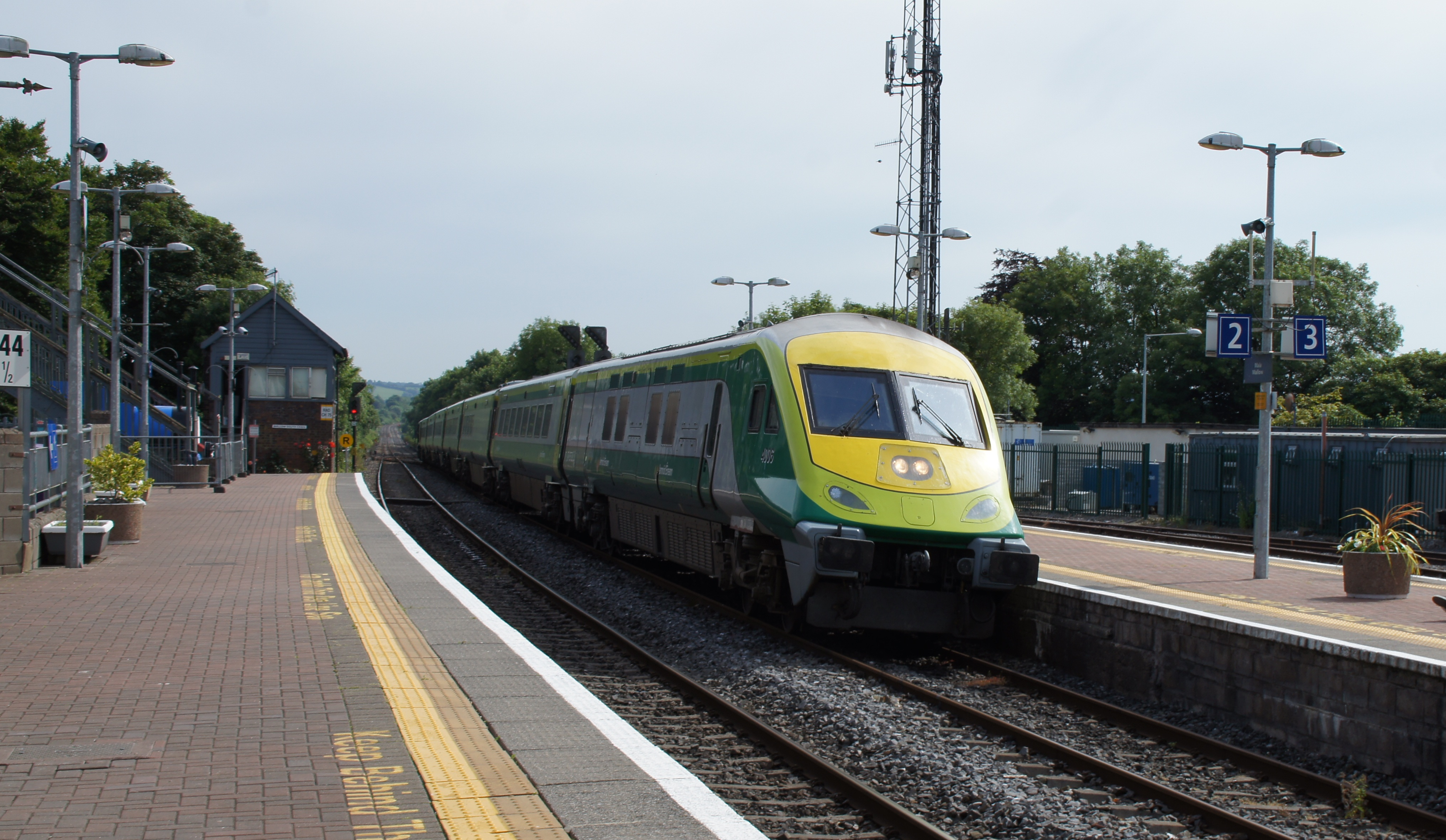
A modern driving van trailer in Ireland

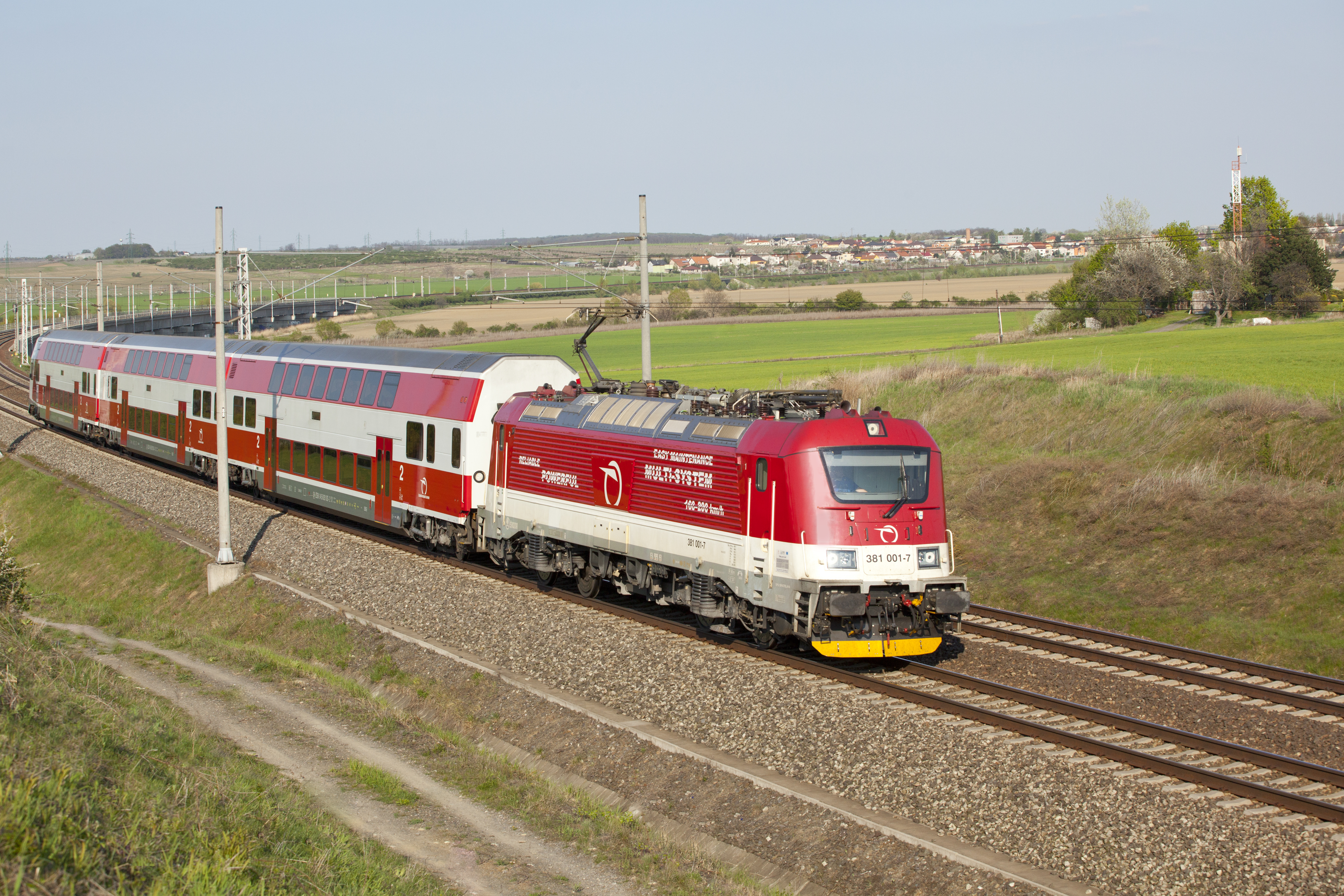
Push–pull train in Slovakia

Historically, push–pull trains with steam power provided the driver with basic controls at the cab end, including the regulator, brake and train whistle. The cab would also be provided with a bell or other signalling code system to communicate with the fireman, who remained on the locomotive to tend to the fire, in order to pass commands to adjust controls not available in the cab.

At low speeds, some push–pull trains are run entirely from the engine with the guard operating bell codes and brakes from the leading cab when the locomotive is pushing the train.

Many mountain railways also operate on similar principles in order to keep the locomotive lower down than the carriage to prevent any opportunity for a carriage to run away from a train down the gradient and also so that even if the locomotive ever ran away, it would not take the carriage with it.

Modern train control systems use sophisticated electronics to allow full remote control of locomotives. Nevertheless, push–pull operation still requires considerable design care to ensure that control system failure does not endanger passengers and also to ensure that in the event of a derailment, the pushing locomotive does not push a derailed train into an obstacle, worsening the accident. The 1984 Polmont rail accident, in Scotland, occurred when a push–pull train struck a cow on the track.

When operating push–pull, the train can be driven from either the locomotive or the alternative cab. If the train is heading in the direction in which the locomotive end of the train is facing, this is considered 'pulling'. If the train is heading in the opposite direction, this is considered 'pushing' and the motorman or engine driver is located in the alternative cab. This configuration means that the locomotive never needs to be uncoupled from the train and ensures fast turnaround times at a railway station terminus.

=== Locomotive in the middle ===
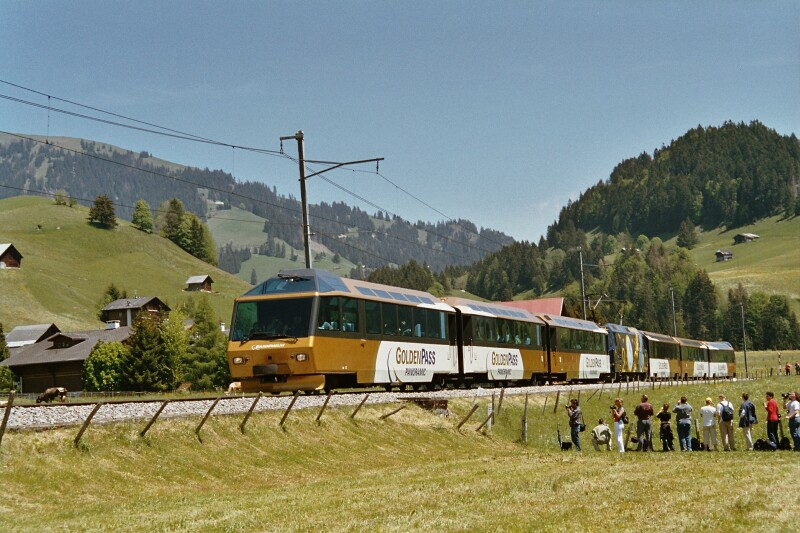
Golden Pass Panoramic train in Switzerland with locomotive in the middle

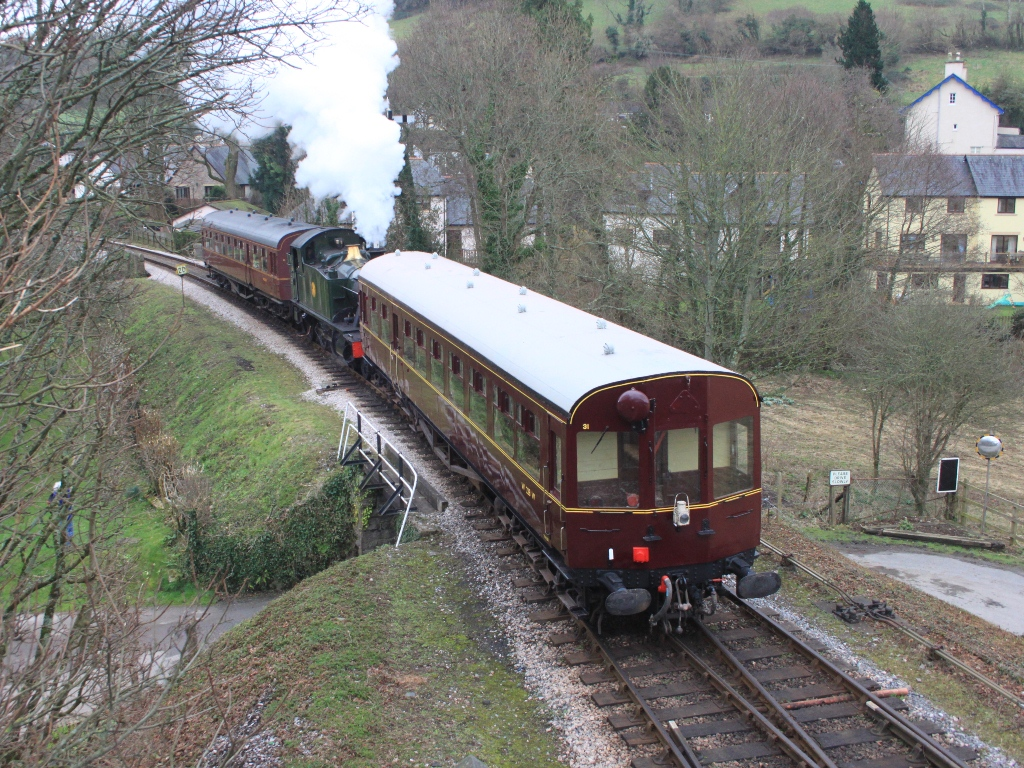
A preserved GWR autotrain, running with the locomotive sandwiched between two driving coaches on the South Devon Railway.

A rare but possible configuration has a locomotive in the middle of the train with control cars at both ends, as was, for instance, used for a time on the Brussels–Amsterdam Benelux train when there were control cars but no three-voltage (3 kV DC, 1.5 kV DC, 25 kV 50 Hz) locomotives supporting the ERTMS train control system in use on the Belgian HSL 4 and the Dutch HSL-Zuid. The Class 28 TRAXX locomotives were later upgraded, and the service went back to "normal" push–pull operation.

Historically, the Great Western Railway ran autotrains with two autocoaches sandwiching a steam locomotive.

== History ==
=== Great Britain ===
==== Steam ====
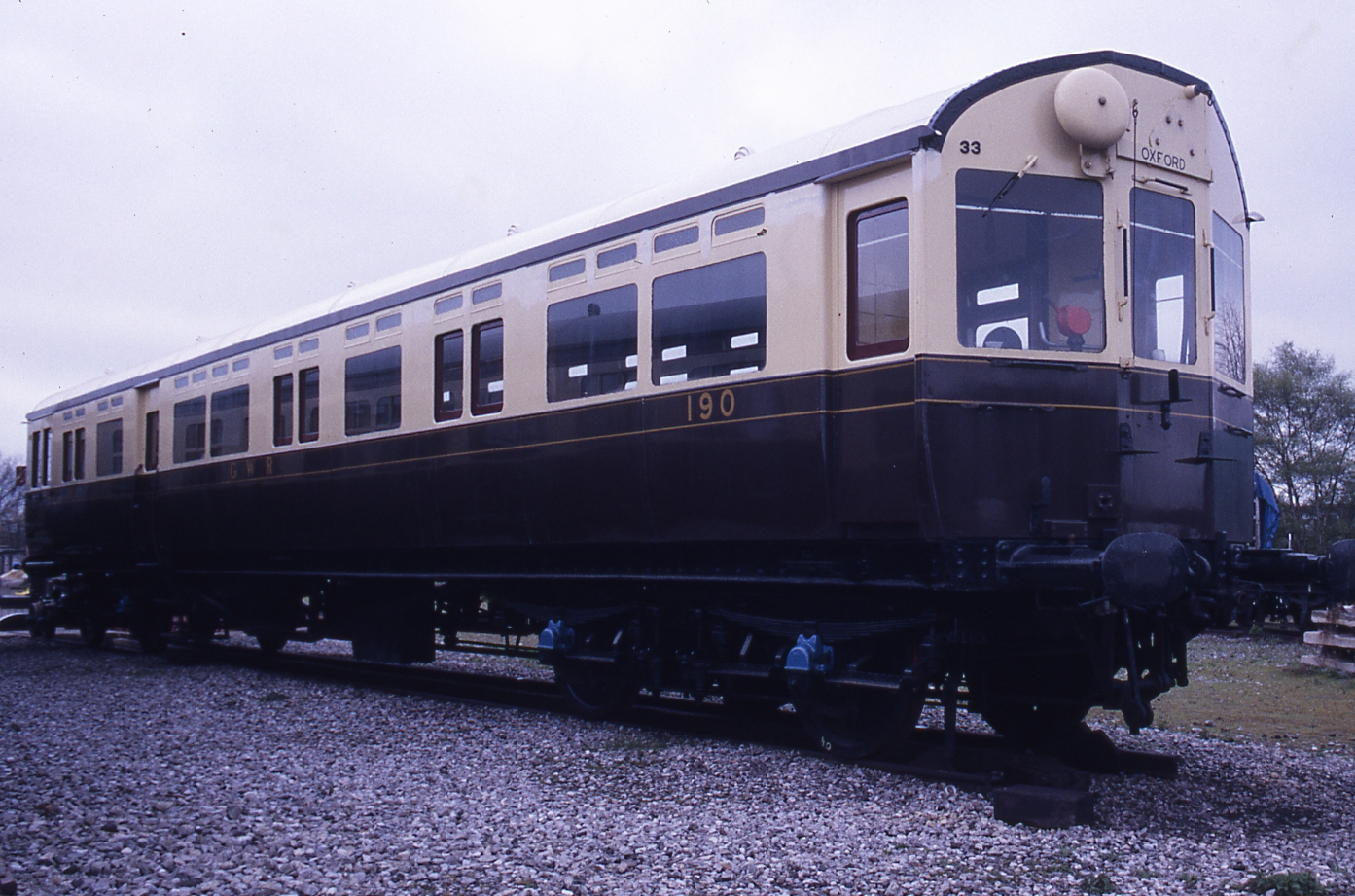
A single GWR autocoach capable of steam push–pull operation

===== Great Western Railway =====
The first company to use the system was the Great Western Railway which, in 1904, equipped carriages and 0-6-0 locomotives as an autotrain to run on the Brentford Branch Line (between Southall and Brentford) as an experimental substitute for steam railcars. Control was by rodding and the mechanism allowed the driving compartment to be either one or two carriages-distant from the engine. With the engine in the middle of a formation, up to four carriages could be used. To reduce the surprise of a locomotive at the "wrong" end of its train, some were initially fitted with panelling painted in carriage livery. The experiment was successful and the company's remaining railcars were gradually converted for autotrain use and purpose-built units constructed.

===== Other railways =====
Other companies followed the lead in 1905: the North Eastern and London, Brighton & South Coast Railway using a compressed-air method of control and the Midland Railway, using a cable-and-pulley mechanism. The Great Central deployed the trains in 1906, using cable controls similar to that of the Midland. By the 1920s, most companies had them and they remained in use until they were replaced by diesel multiple units (DMUs) in the 1950s.

==== Electric and diesel ====
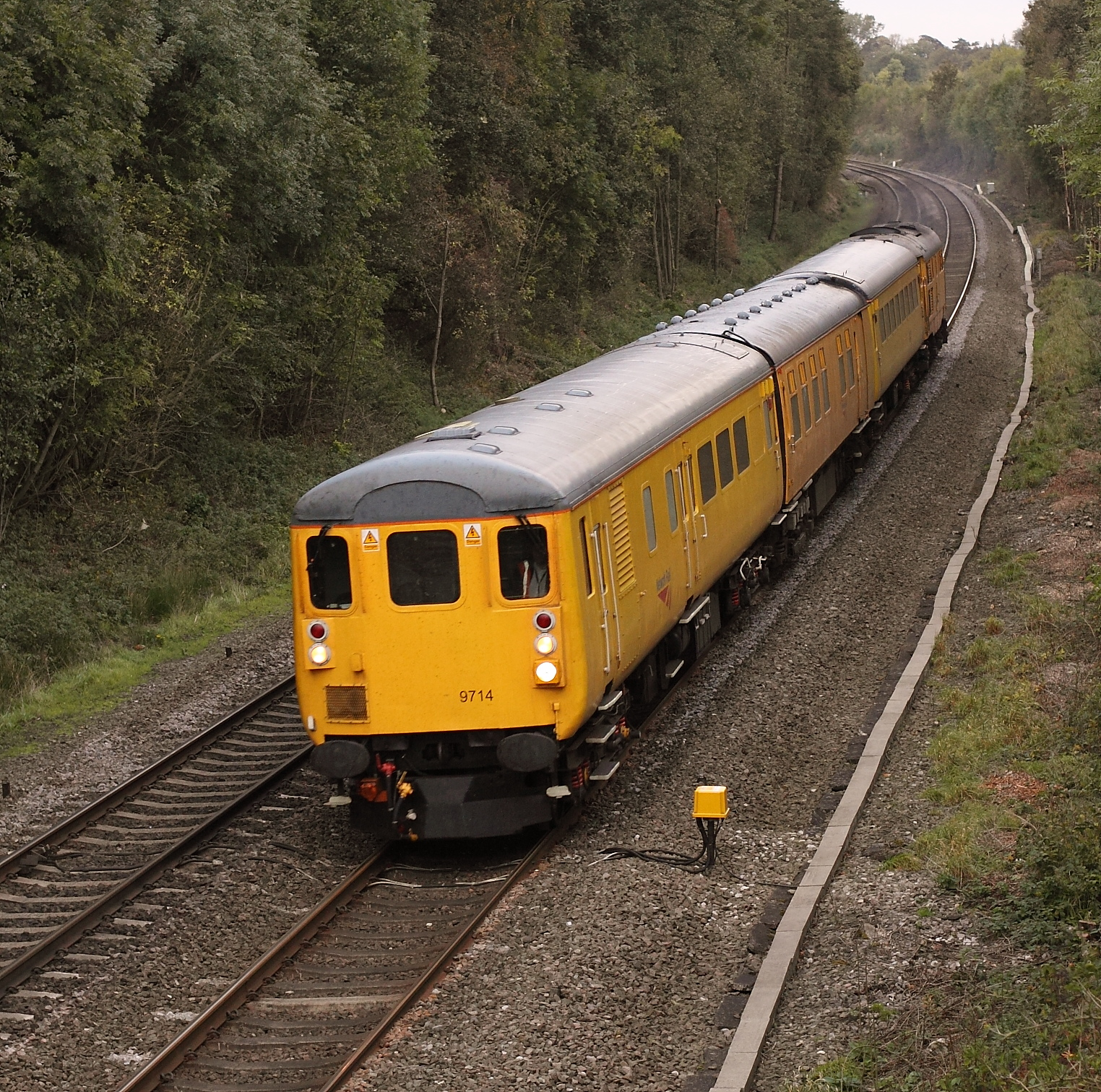
Network Rail Driving Brake Standard Open in October 2009

In 1967, the Southern Region, already familiar with operating electric multiple units, applied the technique to its services from London Waterloo to Bournemouth, which were operated by electro-diesel locomotives.

In the early 1970s, the Scottish Region used a system with a Class 27 locomotive at each end of a rake of coaches that had been retrofitted with the necessary 'Blue Star' multiple working cables to control the remote unit; but some problems of delay in actuation were experienced. They were replaced in 1979 by a system in which a Driving Brake Standard Open (DBSO), converted from a Mark 2, could control the Class 47/7 locomotive via computerised time-division multiplex (TDM) signalling through the train lighting circuits. This had the added benefit that intermediate carriages needed no special equipment, and was found more satisfactory. Such trains became widely used on the intensive passenger service between Edinburgh Waverley and Glasgow Queen Street. When the push–pull sets were replaced by multiple units, the DBSOs were transferred to operate on the Great Eastern Main Line between London Liverpool Street and Norwich, where they were modified to work with Class 86 electric locomotives.

The original system of using the Blue Star multiple working was later revived after privatisation as a way of allowing locomotive-hauled stock to replace multiple units on certain routes, thus increasing capacity without the complications of having to run around or drag a dead locomotive at the rear. It was used by First North Western and Wessex Trains with Class 31s, and by Abellio Greater Anglia, Arriva Trains Northern, Northern Rail and Arriva Rail North with Class 37s all with Mark 2 carriages. The same system was also adopted by Network Rail for its track observation trains, although on many trains one locomotive has recently been replaced by a DBSO modified to work with Blue Star.

==== Driving Van Trailers (DVTs) ====
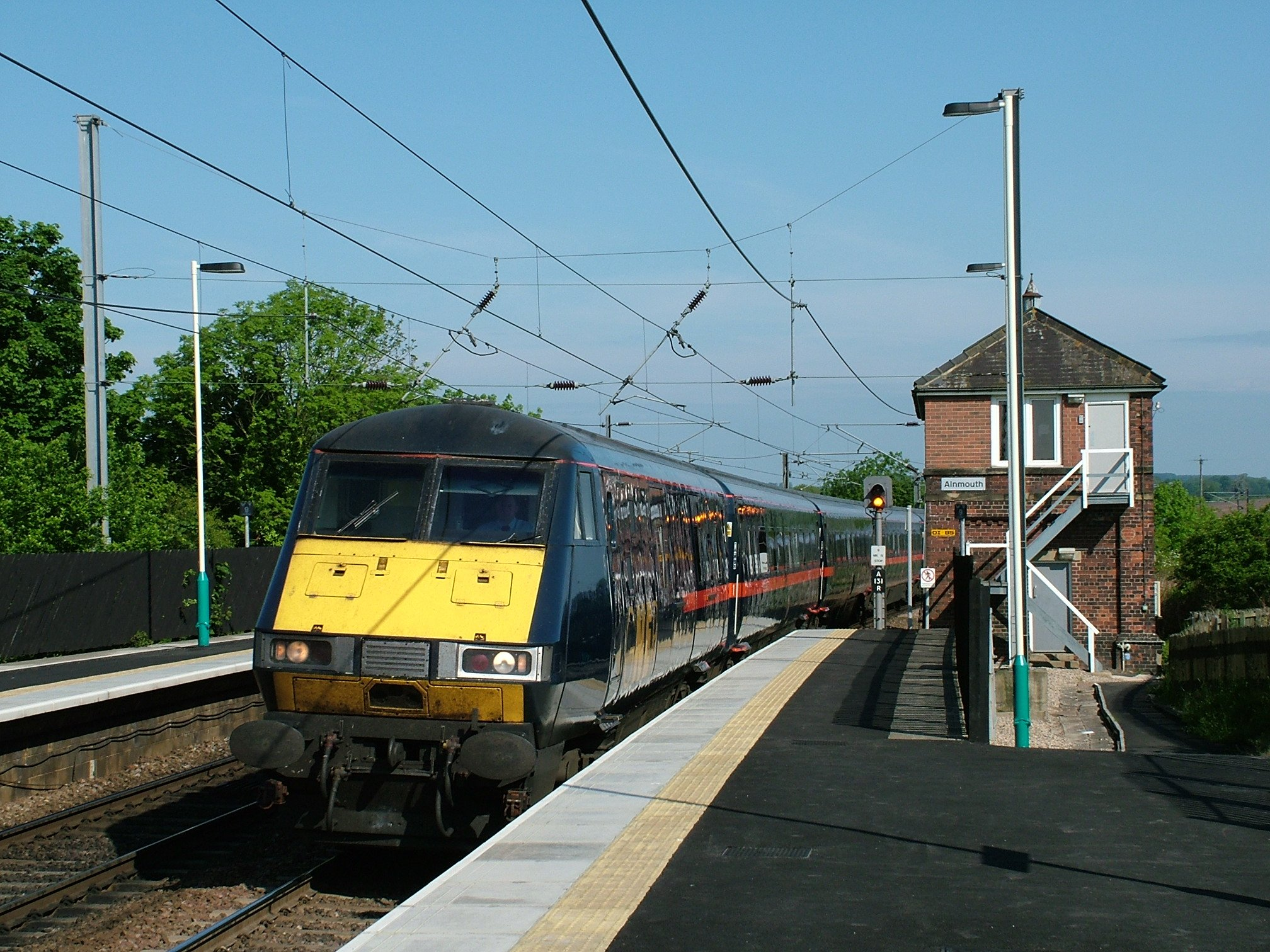
A GNER Mark 4 Driving Van Trailer at Alnmouth in June 2005

In 1988, 52 Mark 3 Driving Van Trailers were built by British Rail Engineering Limited to allow it to replace life expired electric locomotives on the West Coast Main Line. These operated with Mark 2 and Mark 3 sets.

As part of the electrification of the East Coast Main Line, 31 Mark 4 Driving Van Trailers were built in the late 1980s by Metro-Cammell to operate with Mark 4s coaches at the south end of the InterCity 225 sets. Some of these passed to Transport for Wales Rail in 2021 to work on their Holyhead to Cardiff Premier Service.

In the 2000s, some Mark 3s have been modified to operate with Class 67 locomotives with Arriva Trains Wales, Chiltern Railways and Wrexham & Shropshire.

In 2019, new Mark 5 carriages, one of which has a cab, entered service with Class 68 locomotives for TransPennine Express, in a push–pull configuration.

=== Ireland ===
Córas Iompair Éireann's first push–pull trains were conversions of their 2600 Class DMUs (Park Royal body, AEC motors) running with the long withdrawn 201 Class Metropolitan-Vickers Bo-Bo diesels re-engined with EMD 567 prime movers; the cars were subsequently renumbered in the 6100 series (Driving van trailers), 6200 series (trailer with "blind" cab end) and 6300 series (double-gangway intermediate car). In push–pull formation, they operated Dublin Suburban Rail services from 1971 until the inauguration of the DART EMU service in July 1984. The remaining push–pull trains operated on Dublin-Maynooth commuter services until they were supplanted by Cravens, and later by the modern 2600 Class DMUs.

Iarnród Éireann employs push–pull trains of two different kinds. The first of these were built in 1996. These are De Dietrich Ferroviaire–built Enterprise push–pull sets, jointly owned with Northern Ireland Railways for operation on the Dublin to Belfast route. These are powered by 201 Class locomotives.

The other type of push–pull train used in Ireland is the Mark 4 type (not to be confused with the British Rail Mark 4 type). These sets, delivered in 2005–2006, are used exclusively on the Dublin to Cork route, again operated by 201 Class locomotives.

Between 1980 and 2009, Iarnród Éireann operated push–pull sets based on the British Rail Mark 3 design, with a non-gangwayed driving cab fitted. These were operated with 201 Class locomotives, although in the past 121 Class locomotives were also used. The sets originally operated in the Dublin outer-suburban area and on the Limerick to Limerick Junction shuttle, but were gradually moved to mainline InterCity routes out of Dublin Heuston after the introduction of railcar sets elsewhere. The entire Mark 3 fleet was withdrawn in September 2009 and scrapped in 2014.

=== France ===
In June 1958, SNCF commenced operating steam trains in push–pull formation out of Gare de l'Est with 141TC locomotives and Talbot rakes for commuter service. During the creation of the then new TER branch of SNCF, sets known as RRR (Rame Réversible Régionale) and RIO (Rame Inox Omnibus) were used either directly via MU cables (With BB67300 and BB67400 locomotives) or special push-pull apparatus ( BB8500, 25500, 22200 locomotives ) . Transilien also used similar RIB (Rame Inox Banlieue) sets until recently. Only a few RRR sets remain in use with TER Grand Est as of 2026.

SNCF has also used bilevel rakes (VB2N, VO2N, V2N) with electric BB 7600, 15000, 17000, 22200 and BB 27300 locomotives on Transilien (VB2N + BB 17000, 7600 and 27300) and TER (VO2N + BB 15000, V2N + BB 15000 and 22200). All but the V2N and few VB2Ns have been withdrawn as of 2026.

There are also Corail trains that use TDM equipped locomotives (which have the letter R added at the back of their number) with B6Dux or B5uxh cab cars that were converted from baggage cars. They run at 160km/h apart from the TER 200 service from Strasbourg to Bale which runs at 200km/h.

=== North America ===
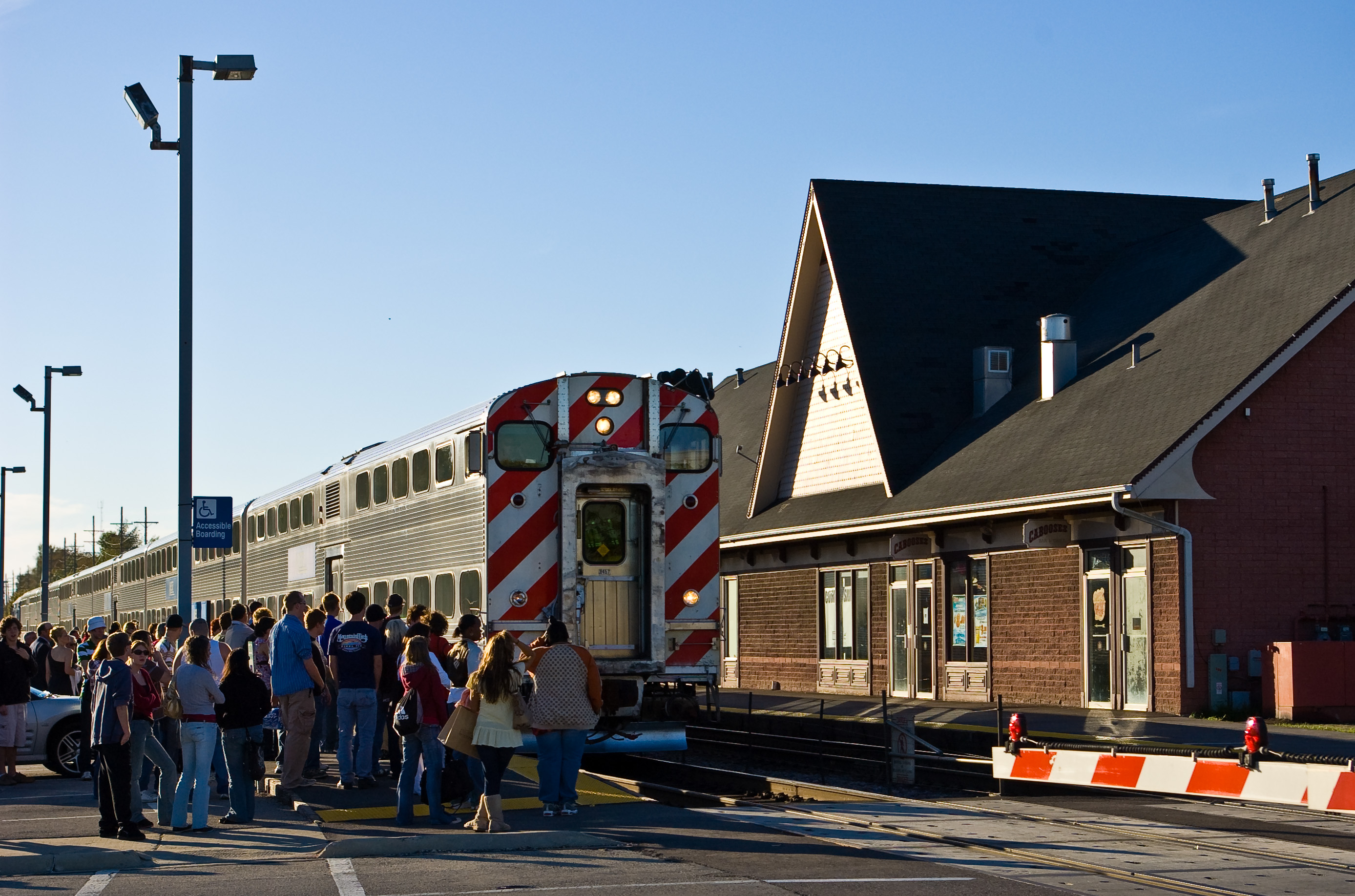
A Metra train in push mode, with a non-locomotive passenger car in the front. Note the engineer's station in the upper level of the passenger car.

The first major application of push–pull operation using the modern single diesel configuration was on the Chicago and North Western Railway, announced in 1958. In 1959, the C&NW received its first gallery cab cars for commuter use. The extreme efficiency and success of these trains is why almost all of the commuter rail services in the United States and Canada utilize 100% push–pull operation on their locomotive-hauled trains. Examples include: Chicago (Metra); New York City (Metro-North, the Long Island Rail Road and New Jersey Transit); Philadelphia (SEPTA); the Washington, DC and Baltimore area (MARC and VRE); Boston (MBTA); Dallas-Fort Worth metroplex (Trinity Railway Express); the Greater Miami area (Tri-Rail); the San Francisco Bay Area (Caltrain and ACE); Southern California (Metrolink and Coaster); Toronto (GO Transit); Montreal (AMT); and the Wasatch Front in Utah (UTA FrontRunner). Most of these systems (except for SEPTA and Metro-North) continue to utilize some type of bi-level passenger cars for push–pull service, either partially or exclusively.

Amtrak has a number of converted Metroliner EMUs in service as cab cars on the Keystone Corridor, where they operate in conjunction with ACS-64 electric locomotives. In addition, many regional services, such as the Michigan Services, Downeaster, and Cascades, are operated with Non-Powered Control Units – EMD F40PH locomotives converted to use as a cab control and baggage car, earning itself the nickname 'cabbage cars'. Similarly, the Capitol Corridor, Gold Runner, and Pacific Surfliner services in California are operated in push–pull configuration using purpose-built cab cars and diesel locomotives.

The Muskingum Electric Railroad was a private, coal-hauling railway in central Ohio that ran for more than 20 years with two driverless General Electric E50C electric locomotives that ran backwards from the coal-fired powerplant they served to the mine where their trains were loaded by affixing bogie trucks, a headlight, and a horn to the last freight car on each train.

=== Israel ===
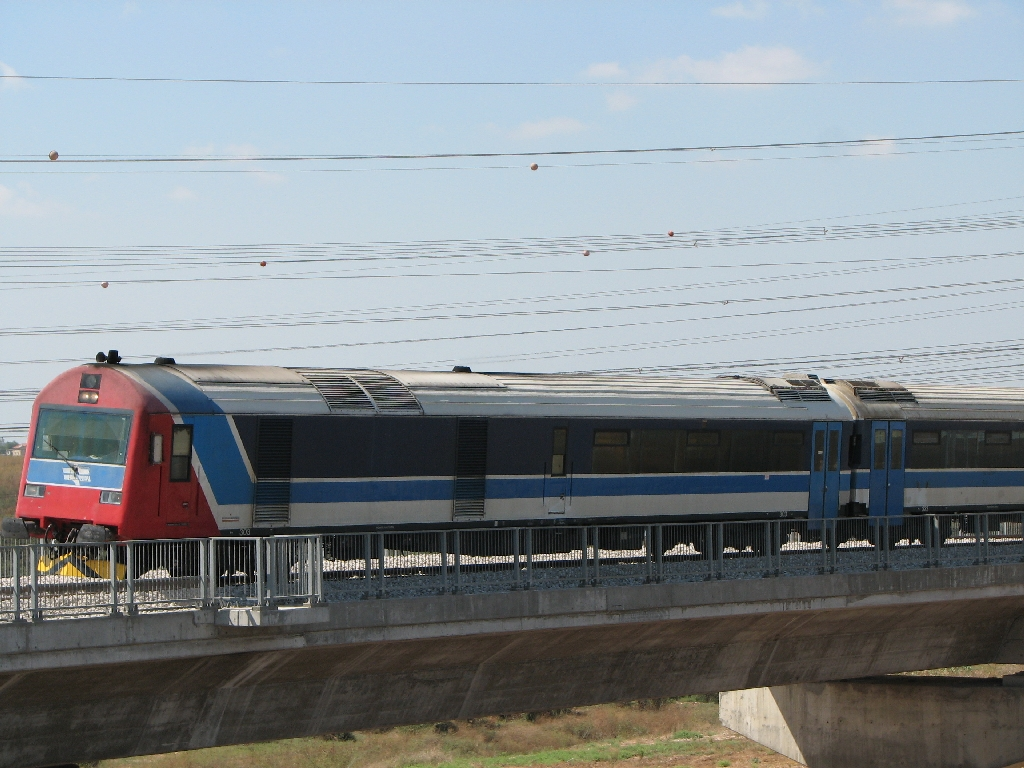
A GEC–Alsthom push–pull of Israel Railways (IR)

In 1996, Israel Railways began running GEC–Alsthom push–pull coaches. Since then, it has also acquired push–pull coaches from Bombardier and Siemens. As of 2016, the bulk of Israel Railways' passenger operations use push–pull coaches. All of them have one locomotive at one end and a control car at the other end.

=== Australia ===
The New South Wales XPT long-distance passenger trains used by NSW TrainLink operate in a push–pull operation. In the past V/Line operated P class push–pulls on interurban services to Bacchus Marsh and Wyndham Vale until 2017. The 2000 class DMUs operated by the South Australian State Transport Authority could be found with at least one motor car and one cab car in a push–pull configuration until their withdrawal in mid-2015.

=== New Zealand ===
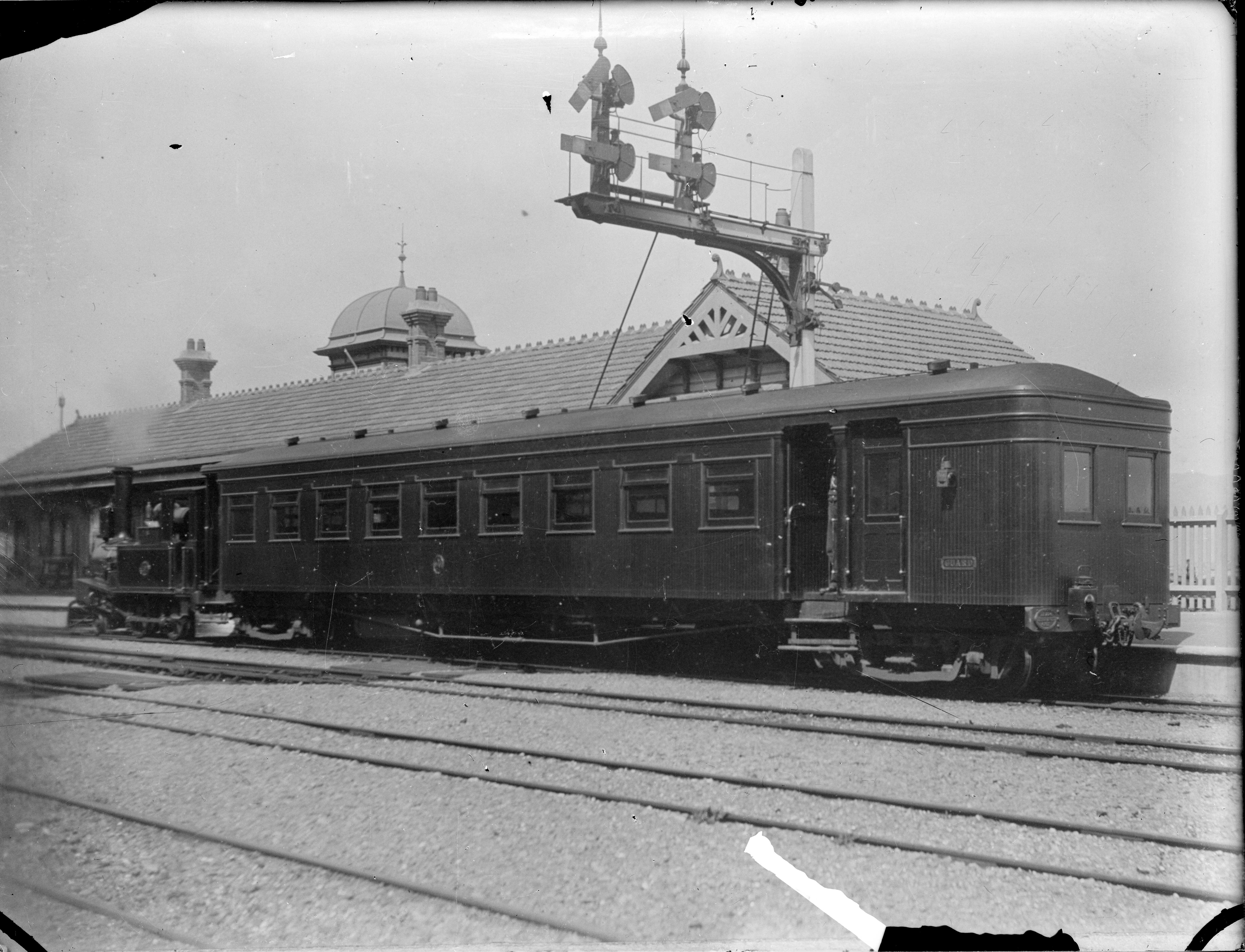
D Class NZR no 197 at Lower Hutt, 1906 with motor train

In the first quarter of the 20th century up to 13 motor trains ran on NZR.

Until 2015, the Auckland suburban network run by Transdev used rebuilt British Rail Mark 2 carriages in either four, five or six car configurations. Three to five SA class carriages and an SD class driving carriage, fitted with a cab, were coupled to a DC class (4- and 5-car) or DFT/DFB class (6-car) locomotive, leased from KiwiRail.

All SA and SD class cars were rebuilt by Hillside Workshops. Auckland also operated former Queensland Rail SX carriages in push–pull mode with two DBR class locomotives.

Following electrification of most of the Auckland suburban railway network, these diesel units have been replaced by a modern electrical fleet that consist of one or two sets of 3 car units (each of which have one carriage that can service passengers with disabilities).

=== Argentina ===
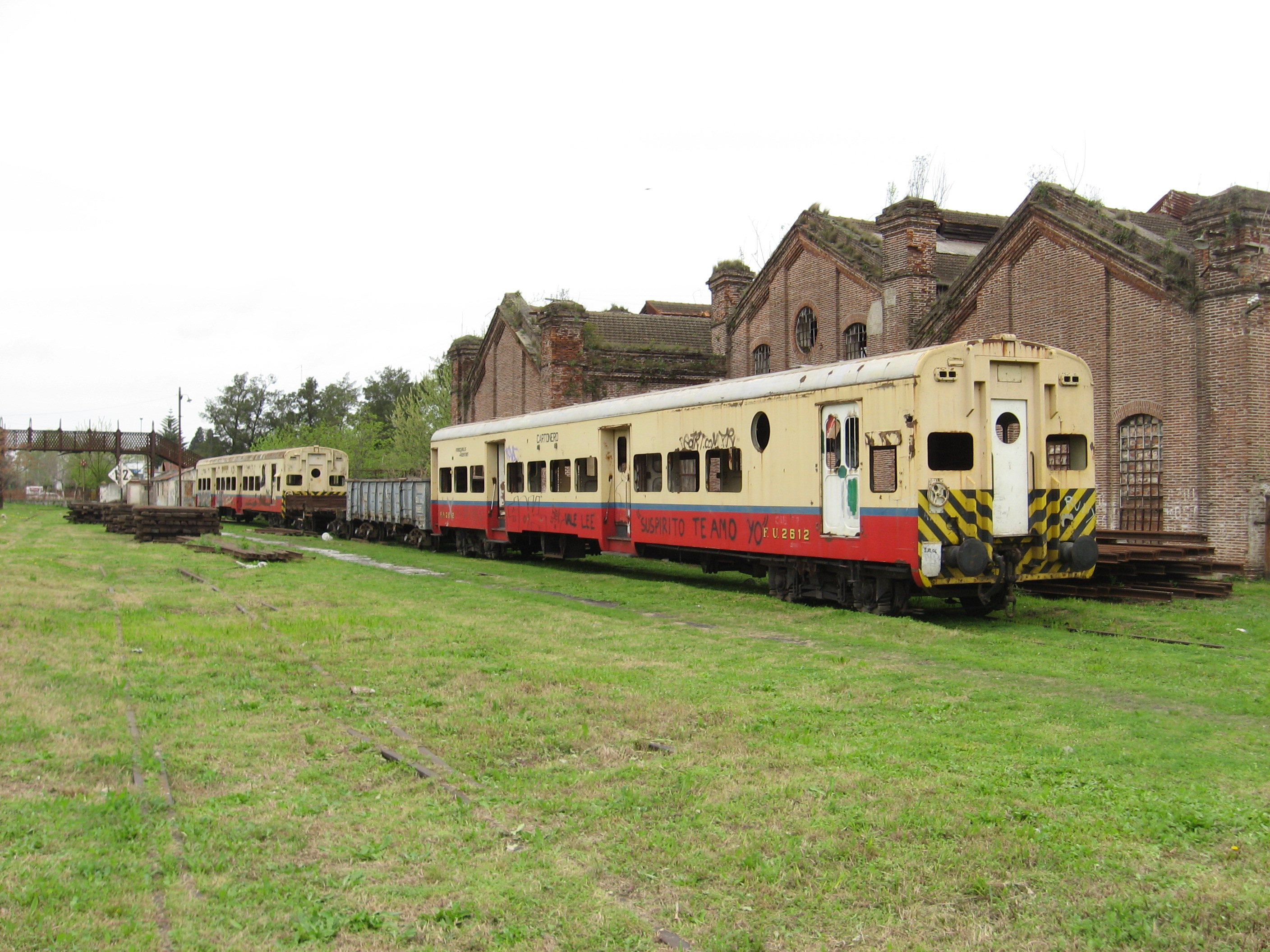
Former Roca Line push pull cab cars

Push pull trains were used from the 1972 to 1989 in Greater Buenos Aires, with the first and most successful of these being on the Belgrano Norte Line, with push pull trains beginning operations in 1972 and running very successfully. However, acts of vandalism required the removal of cab cars from service until there were none operational in 1989. In the second half of the 70s, the Roca Line also began operating push pull trains. Unlike on the Belgrano Norte, push pull trains on the Roca experienced many problems that made their operation problematic. Nevertheless, push pull operations continued until electrified services were inaugurated on November 9, 1985. The San Martín Line also tested push pull trains, but didn't see much success and ended operations shortly thereafter.

== See also ==
- Air brake (rail)
- Cab (locomotive)
- Control car
- Double-heading
- Distributed power
- GWR Autocoach
- Rail terminology
- Railway brakes
- Top and tail
