= Voiture de banlieue à 2 niveaux =

VB 2N
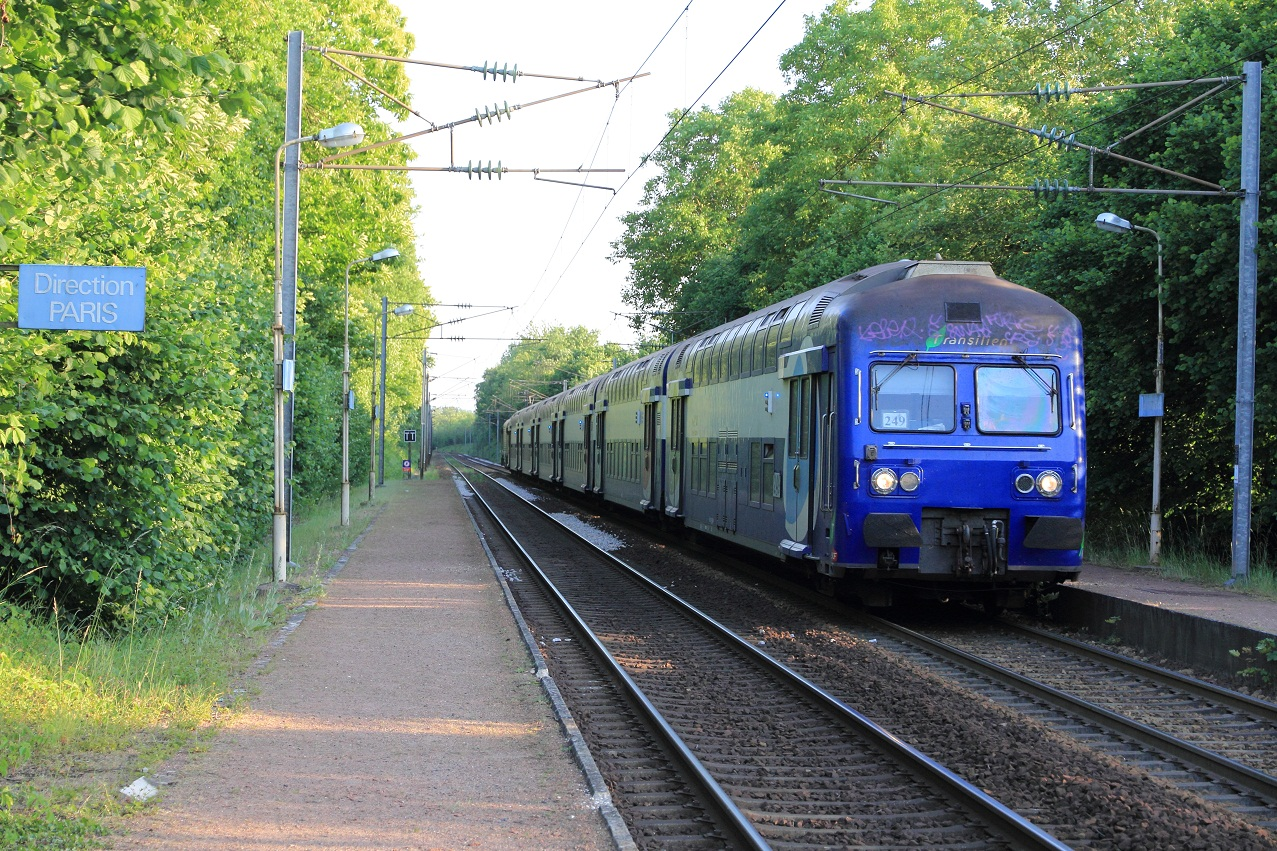
- VB 2N at Lavilletertre station in 2011.

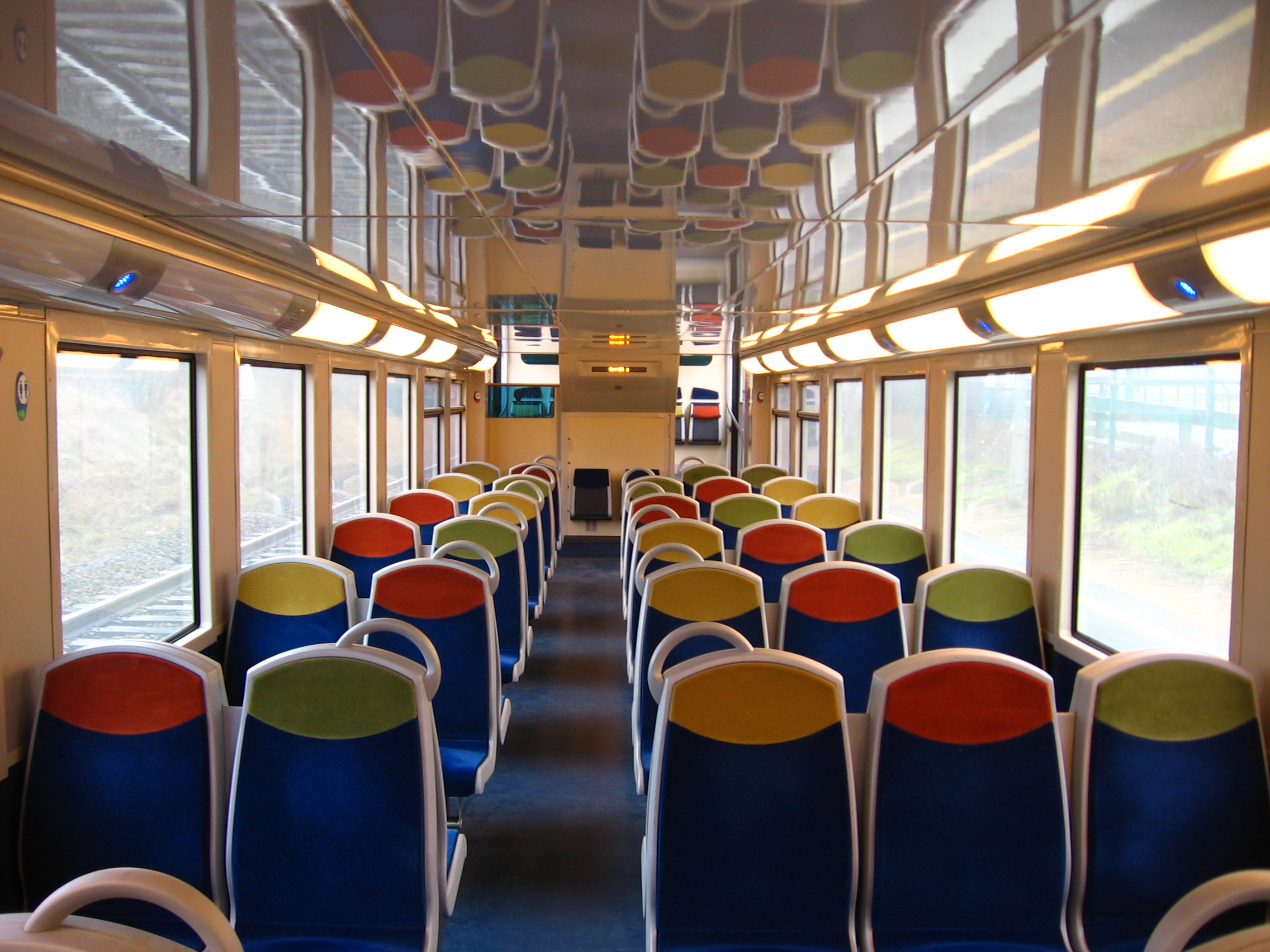
- Lower floor of a renovated VB 2N.
- Manufacturer: CIMT / ANF
- Replaced: Voiture État à 2 étages, Z 5300
- Constructed: 1974–1984
- Refurbished: 2002–2008
- Scrapped: 2021–
- Number built: 589
- Successor: Z 50000, Regio 2N, RER NG
- Operator: SNCF
- Line served: Transilien Line J (Paris-Saint-Lazare)

Specifications
- Car length: 24.28 m (79 ft 8 in)
- Width: 2.856 m (9 ft 4.4 in)
- Height: 4.32 m (14 ft 2 in)
- Maximum speed: 140 km/h (87 mph)
- Track gauge: 1,435 mm (4 ft 8 1/2 in) standard gauge

The voiture de banlieue à 2 niveaux (English: suburban double-deck carriage), shortened to VB 2N, is a type of double-deck passenger railcar used on Transilien, the commuter rail network in the Île-de-France region of France. The cars are unpowered and designed to be paired with an electric locomotive.

The coaches, built from 1974, are the successors of the Chemins de Fer de l'État's 1933 built Voiture État à 2 étages. They are currently in use on Line J of the Transilien network. They were previously used on Transilien lines H and K as well as services between Gare de l'Est and Tournan station, which became the RER E.

Since 2012, the VB 2N trains have been shifted from busier Transilien lines to less busy routes on Transilien network as new railway stock entered in service, most notably the single-level Z 50000 and double-deck Regio 2N (Z 57000) trainsets. The VB 2N trains are scheduled to be retired.

== Description ==
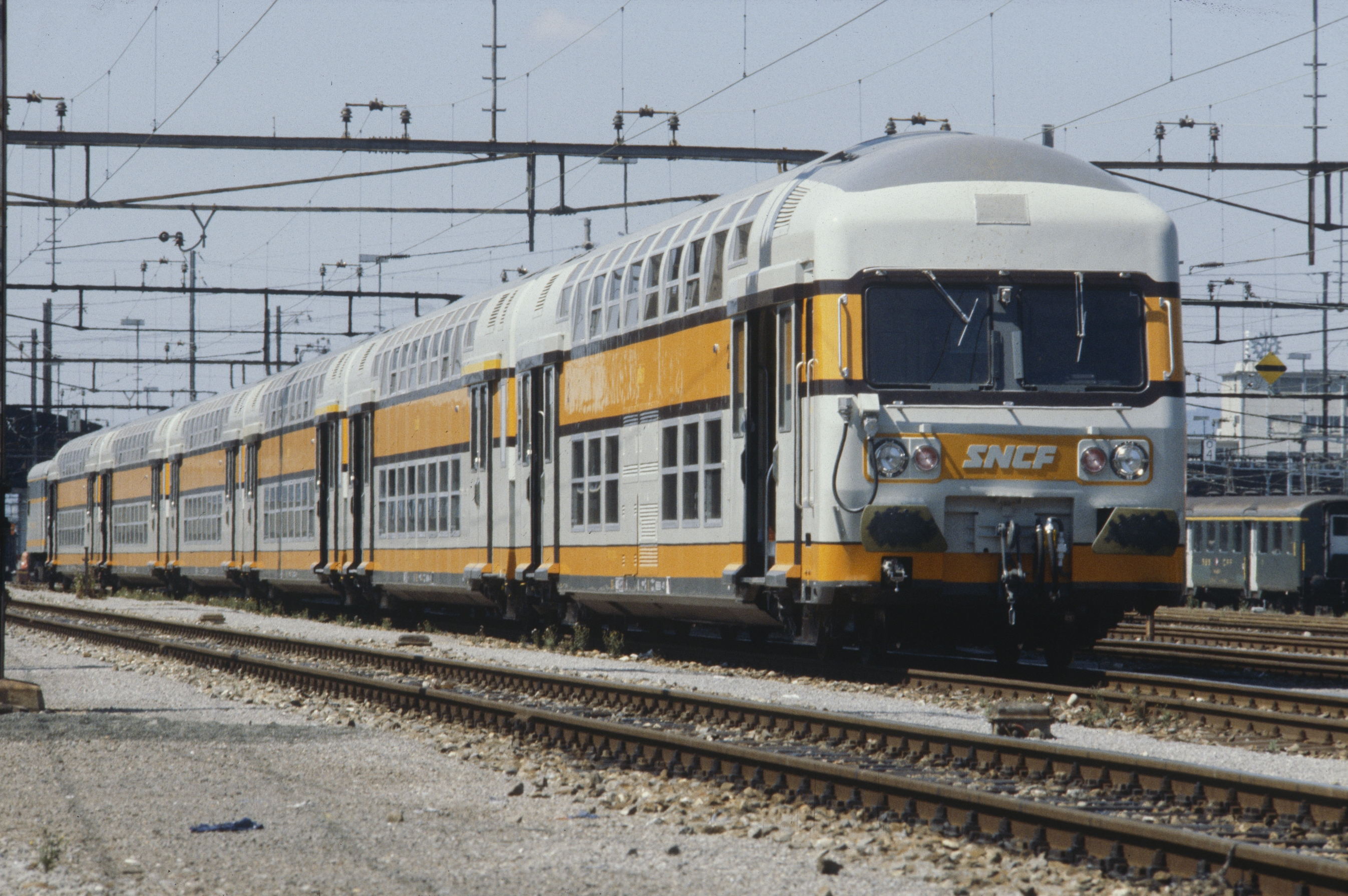
Undergoing trials in 1980

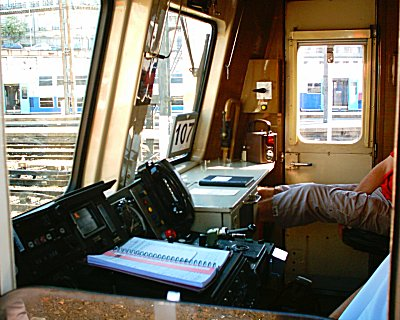
The driving cab of a VB 2N #107 at Gare Saint-Lazare.

The VB 2Ns are designed to be used in push-pull mode, although the cars are not powered, there is a control car at one end of the train so that the locomotive does not have to run around its train at the terminus.

Passenger space is divided in two levels. Each end of coach is a vestibule from which two separate sets of stairs lead to the upper and lower-decks. The walkway and seating on the lower deck is situated below platform level to gain space and avoid unnecessary height. The upper-deck is relatively spacious as height is restricted although adults may walk standing up.

All coaches have toilets apart from both end carriages.

Next stop is announced vocally and visually.

Speed is limited to 140 km/h (87 mph).

=== Retirement ===
The VB 2N equipment was retired starting in 2019, as Île-de-France Mobilités and SNCF replaced them with newer equipment. Since early 2019, the VB 2N trains on the Transilien Line J are gradually being replaced by the Z 50000 "Francilian" single-level electric multiple unit (EMU) trainsets. Starting in 2021, the VB 2N trains on the Transilien Line N are scheduled to be replaced by new Regio 2N (Z 57000) double-deck EMU trainsets. Additionally, starting in 2022, some of the Transilien Line J traffic between Paris and Mantes-la-Jolie will be shifted to an extension of the RER E line which will be equipped with Z 58000 "RER NG" double-deck EMU trainsets.

== Derivatives ==
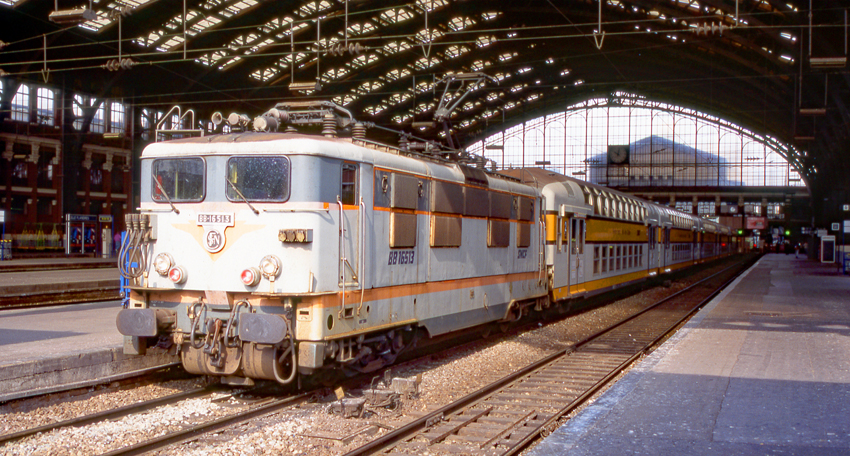
BB 16513 with VR 2N set at Lille-Flandres station.

Two other series of French trainsets were derived from the VB 2N:

- Voiture Omnibus à 2 Niveaux (VO 2N): used on TER (regional express train) routes in the Centre-Val de Loire, Hauts-de-France and Normandie regions.
- Voiture Régionale à 2 Niveaux (VR 2N): used on TER routes in the Nord-Pas-De-Calais region.
