= Voiture État =

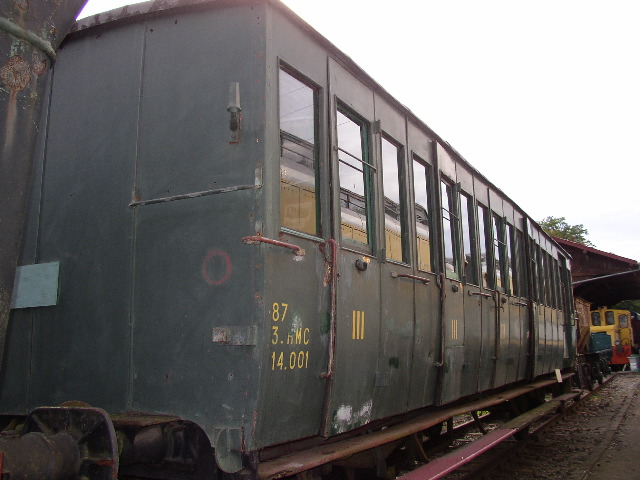
- A voiture État at Gare de Pont-Erambourg.
- Constructed: 1902 to 1927
- Operator: Chemin de Fer de l'Ouest

Specifications
- Track gauge: 1,435 mm (4 ft 8 1/2 in)

The voiture État, nicknamed hen-house due to is numerous windows is a type of railway passenger car.

These cars disposed of an indestructible chassis below a wooden frame and equipped with a door for each compartment. The cars were built from 1902 to 1927 by the Chemins de Fer de l'Ouest (later incorporated in the Chemins de Fer de l'État) for use on omnibus and intercity services of the company. 488 cars were modernised from 1952 to 1961 with a replacement metallic frame in replacement of the wooden one as well as the construction of a central corridor. Only a very few coaches remain in preservation, most of which at Pont-Erambourg.

== See also ==
- Voiture État à 2 étages
