= Automobile (disambiguation) =

An automobile or car is a kind of wheeled motor vehicle.

Automobile may also refer to:

- Automobile (magazine), a magazine started in 1988
- The Automobile (magazine), the 1909–1917 name of the magazine Automotive Industries
- Motor vehicle, which also includes trucks and buses

== See also ==
- Car (disambiguation)
