= List of Chemins de Fer de l'État locomotives =

The Chemins de Fer de l'État was one of the five main constituents of the SNCF at its creation in 1938.

It was formed in May 1878 from the merger of ten railway companies, not all of which had opened. In its initial renumbering of constituents' stock, the État renumbered its tender locomotives in the 2000 or 3000 block depending on the number of driving axles, and tank locomotives in 0200 and 0300 blocks. This scheme had to be abandoned in 1909 when the État bought the Chemins de Fer de l'Ouest in that year; as the enlarged État had by then too many tank locomotives for that scheme.

== Locomotives from founding companies ==
Type	État No. (1878 series)	État No. (1909 series)	SNCF No.	Manufacturer Serial numbers	Year made	Quantity made	Year(s) withdrawn	Comments
Steam locomotives
C	3021–3036	030-141 – 030-156	—	Graffenstaden	1865–68	16	1927–35	ex Charentes 1–16
B t	0208–0209	20-001 – 20-002	—	L. Corpet	1870	2		ex Charentes 501–502
B t	0210–0211	—	—	L. Corpet	1870	2		ex Charentes 503–504
1B	2171–2183	120-501 – 120-513	—	Graffenstaden	1870–71	13	1919–27	ex Charentes 101–113
B′B	0401	—	—	Fives-Lille	1868	1	1886	ex Charentes 401, exx CF Luxembourg, acquired 1872; Meyer locomotive
1B	2141–2152	120-549 – 120-560	—	Société Nouvelle des Forges et Chantiers de la Méditerranée	1873–74	12	1919–1929	ex Charentes 151–162
1B	2101–2111	120-571 – 120-581	—	SACM	1874	11	1923–1929	ex Charentes 163–173
C	3121–3138	030-421 – 030-438	030.B.431	SACM (12); Fives-Lille (6)	1875–76	18	1929–?	ex Charentes 51–68
1B	2112–2119	120-541 – 120-548	—	SACM	1876	8	1923–1929	ex Charentes 174–181
B1 t	0201–0204	21-001 – 21-004	—	Graffenstaden	1865	4	1910–17	ex Vendée 1–4
B′B′	0402	—	—	Avonside Engine Co.	1870	1	1879	ex Vendée 5; double Fairlie locomotive
C	3037–3060	030-011 – 030-028	3-030.A.14 – 28	Graffenstaden (8); Ernest Goüin et Cie. (4); Schneider et Cie. (8); SACM (4)	1871–78	24		ex Vendée 6–29; 6 rebuilt as 2-6-0s nos 3601–3606
1B	2001–2008	120-001 – 120-007	—	Ernest Goüin et Cie. (4); Schneider et Cie.	1873–75	8	1919–34	ex Vendée 51–58; 2004 rebuilt as 2-4-2
1B	2201–2206	120-531 – 120-536	—	Fives-Lille	1872	6	1916–1921	ex Orléans à Châlons-sur-Marne 1–6
1B	2207–2210	120-521 – 120-524	—	Ernest Goüin et Cie.	1872	4	1910–21	ex Orleans à Châlons-sur-Marne 7–10
C	3001–3008	030-161 – 030-168	—	Société J. F. Cail & Cie.	1875–76	8	1919–28	ex Orléans à Châlons-sur-Marne 201–208
C	3161–3168	030-511 – 030-518	—	Société J. F. Cail & Cie.	1874	8	1919–1929	ex Orléans à Châlons-sur-Marne 301–308
C n2t	0306–0310	30-921 – 30-925	—	Ateliers de Tubize	1872	5	1919–23	ex Orléans à Rouen 21–25
1B	2161–2167	—	—	Ateliers de Tubize	1872–74	7	1892	ex Orléans à Rouen 101–107
B t	0205–0207	—	—	Ateliers de Tubize	1872	3	1893–1907	ex Orléans à Rouen 118–120
C t	0314	30-501		L. Corpet	1870	1	1923	ex Orléans à Rouen 147
C	3181–3182	030-501 – 030-502	—	Ateliers de Tubize	1874	2	1923–1927	Renumbered 3281–3282 in 1882; né Orléans à Rouen 201–202
C t	0311–0313	30-531 – 30-533	—	L. Corpet	1875	3	1926–1928	ex Nantais 1–3
1B	2235–2236	—	—	Mulhouse Workshops	1854	2	1888–89	ex Nantais 10–11, né Est 227 and 234
1B	2231–2234	—	—	L. Corpet	1875	4	1894–95	ex Nantais 21–24
C	3009–3010	030-001 – 030-002	—	L. Corpet	1876	2	1910–28	ex État 3101–3102, né Nantais 31–32
C n2t	0301–0305	30-911 – 30-915	—	SACM	1876	5	1923–36	ex Maine-et-Loire à Nantes 1–5
C n2t	0315–0317	30-901 – 30-903	—	Graffenstaden	1872	3	1920–23	ex Bordeaux à La Sauve 1–3

== Locomotives acquired 1878–1909 ==
Type	État No. (1878 series)	État No. (1909 series)	SNCF No.	Manufacturer Serial numbers	Year made	Quantity made	Year(s) withdrawn	Comments
Steam locomotives
Steam railcar	01–02	—	—	Fives-Lille	1879	2	1890–91	24-seat automotrice
1B	2009–2099, 2500–2528	120-021 – 120-118	3-120.A.24 – 116	Fives-Lille (60); SACM (10); Schneider et Cie. (50)	1879–84	120		20 rebuilt as 2-4-2s
C	3061–3100	030-031 – 030-078	3-030.A.31 – 78	Fives-Lille (15); SACM (15); Société J. F. Cail & Cie. (10)	1879–80	40		3 rebuilt as 2-6-0s
C t	0318–0322	30-511 – 30-515	—	Ernest Goüin et Cie.	1874–78	5	1919–1932	ex Seudre 1–5, acquired 1880
1B	2028, 2080	120-011 – 120-012	—	SACM (1); Fives-Lille (1)	1880	2	1928–30	
C	3139–3160	030-481 – 030-498	—	SACM	1880–82	22		4 rebuilt as 2-6-0
C	3500–3519	030-079 – 030-093	3-030.A.87 – 90	Société J. F. Cail & Cie.	1880	20		3 rebuilt as 2-6-0s
C	3169–3206	030-441 – 030-477	030.B.472	SACM	1882	38		1 rebuilt as 2-6-0
C n2	3520–3569	030-101 – 030-130	3-030.A.115 – 123	Batignolles	1882–83	50		21 rebuilt as 2-6-0s
C	3101–3104	030-521 – 030-524	—	Schneider et Cie.	1883	4	1932	ex Alais – Rhône – Méditerranée 7–10, acquired 1883; other locomotives to Medoc (6) and PLM (2501–2505)
D n2	4001–4040	040-001 – 040-040	—	SACM	1883	40	1929–32	Sold to Algeria, became 040.451 – 040.490, then 4.B.451 – 490
1B n2t	0221–0230	21-901 – 21-910	—	SACM	1885	10	1919–22	
1′B1	2520	121-001	—	(rebuilt)	1887	1	1927	
1′B1	2691	121-202	—	SACM	1889	1	1934	Exhibited at 1889 Paris Exposition
1′B1	2602–2620	121-051 – 121-069	3-121.C.51 – 69	Fives-Lille (9); Anciens Établissements Cail (10)	1891–94	19		2609 Patay exhibited at the 1893 World's Columbian Exposition at Chicago, Illinois, USA
C t	0323–0325	30-521 – 30-523	—	Société J. F. Cail & Cie.	1872	3	1919–22	ex Barbezieux à Châteauneuf-sur-Charente 1–3, acquired 1893
1B n2t	0231–0240	21-501 – 21-510	—	Franco-Belge	1894	10	1922	
1′B1	2004…2518	121-011 – 121-039	3-121.B.28 – 37	(rebuilt)	1894	20		
1′B1 n2t	0241–0250	22-101 – 22-110	—	Franco-Belge	1897	10	1926–30	
2′B n4v	2701–2706	220-701 – 220-706	—	SACM	1897	6	1925–32	
2′B n2	2751–2754	220-011 – 220-014	—	Schneider et Cie.	1898	4	1926–32	
2′B n2	2851–2856	220-001 – 220-006	—	Baldwin Locomotive Works	1899	6	1920–23	
2′B n4v	2801–2705	220-801 – 220-805	—	Baldwin Locomotive Works	1899–1900	5	1922–32	Vauclain compounds
2′B1 n2	2901–2910	221-001 – 221-010	—	Baldwin Locomotive Works	1900	10	1927–30	PLM bought identical locomotives
2′C n4v	3701–3755	230-001 – 230-055	3-230.B.1 – 55	Fives-Lille (20); SFCM (20); Schneider et Cie (15)	1901–09	55		
1′C n2v	3601–3635	130-001 – 130-035		SFCM (20); Tours Workshops (15)	1903–05	35		
Steam railcar	0101–0102	11.001 – 11.002	—	Purrey	1904	2	1919	36-seat automotrice
2′B1 n4v	2951–2960	221-101 – 221-110	3-221.A.101 – 110	SFCM	1905	10		Based on PO 3000-series
1′C	3301–3320	130-501 – 130-520	—	Fives-Lille (5); État Workshops (15)	1906–11	20		
2′C n4v	3801–3840	230-801 – 230-883	3-230.G.801 – 883	Fives-Lille (10); SFCM (41); Franco-Belge (10); Schneider et Cie. (22)	1908–12	83	?–1960	“Panamas”; copies of PO 4000-series

== Locomotives acquired from the Chemin de fer de l’Ouest in 1909 ==
Type	Ouest No.	État No. (1909 series)	SNCF No.	Manufacturer Serial numbers	Year made	Quantity made	Year(s) withdrawn	Comments
Steam locomotives
1A1 n2t	0105–0137	12.001 – 12.014	—	Alcard, Buddicom & Cie.	1843–44	(14)		
1B	321–327	120-701 – 120-705	—	Etab. Cavé	1849	7	1909–11	
1B t	329–336, 352–362	21-561 – 21-573	—	Ernest Goüin et Cie.	1849–56	20	1912–23	
C n2	1471–1522	030-201 – 030-251	—	Société J. F. Cail & Cie. (42); Parent & Schaken (10)	1852–60	52		
B1	270	021-001	—	Ernest Goüin et Cie.	1853	1	1913	
B1	281–311	021-501 – 021-529	—	Ernest Goüin et Cie. (17); Alcard, Buddicom & Cie. (14)	1853–56	29	1909–16	
B1	201–252	021-051 – 083	—	Alcard, Buddicom & Cie. (26); Sotteville Workshops (7)	1855–67	33	1909–17	
1B	337–348	120-711 – 120-720	—	Ernest Goüin et Cie.	1856	12	1909–12	
C n2	1431–1446	030-401 – 030-413	—	Alcard, Buddicom & Cie.	1857	13	1912–19	
C n2	1541–1575	030-261 – 030-295	—	Société J. F. Cail & Cie. (15); Ernest Goüin et Cie. (20)	1857–58	35	1913–36	
1B n2t	1-40, 51–150, 41–50	21-601 – 21-730	—	Fives-Lille (16); Société J. F. Cail & Cie. (46); Parent et Schaken (6); Graffenstaden (8); StEG (10); Kitson & Co. (20); SACM (30); Alcard, Buddicom & Cie.(10)	1858–93	150		“Bicyclettes”
C n2	1601–1701	030-301 – 030-392	030.B.358 – 392	Ernest Goüin et Cie. (29); Schneider et Cie. (72)	1860–67	92		“Mammouth”
1B	381–400	120-731 – 120-748	—	Alcard, Buddicom & Cie.	1860	20	1912–29	
C n2t	1011–1114	30-601 – 30-704	3-030.TA.607 – 698	Société J. F. Cail & Cie. (6); Ernest Goüin et Cie. (18); Graffenstaden (8); Fives-Lille (6); SACM (71); CF Ouest (4)	1861–84	114		
B1	401…423	021-011 – 021-026	—	(rebuilt)	1866–74	16	1909–22	rebuilt from 0-6-0s
1B	744–897	120-751 – 120-881	—	Société J. F. Cail & Cie. (13); FCM (12); Ernest Goüin et Cie. (34); CF Ouest (3); Graffenstaden (54); André Koechlin & Cie. (26); F&CO (3)	1862–75	145	318–320	
B n2t		20-011 – 20-013	—	J. Voruz	1867	3	1916	né Vitré à Fougères 1–3
C n2	1904–2244	030-531 – 030-860	3-030.C.533 – 860	Fives-Lille (34); F&CO (20); Graffenstaden (30); Schneider et Cie. (42); Claparède (25); SACM (81); Ernest Goüin et Cie. (41); Batignolles (10); Wiener Neustädt (50); Franco-Belge (6)	1867–85	339		
C n2t	1372–1373	30-021 – 30-022	—	Graffenstaden	1869	2	1916	né Magny à Chars 1–2
C n2t	1374–1383	30-051 – 30-060	—	Schneider et Cie.	1868–69	10	1913–37	né Orléans à Rouen 1–10
C n2t	1384–1397	30-061 – 30-074	—	Fives-Lille (9); Société J. F. Cail & Cie. (5)	1869–75	14	1912–26	né Orléans à Rouen 51–64
C n2t	1401	30-001	—	Société J. F. Cail & Cie.	1872	1	1910	né Lisieux à Orbec 1
C n2t	1412–1416	30-011 – 30-015	—	Fives-Lille	1872	6	1913–32	né Alencon à Conde 1–6
1B	707–743	120-901 – 120-937	3-120.A.909	Ernest Goüin et Cie. (27); SACM (10)	1877–78	37	1924–36	one stored for preservation, but destroyed in 1944
1′B1 n2t	191–198	22-001 – 22-008	—	Fives-Lille	1878	8	1912–20	“Pilotes”
1B t	317	21-521	—	Schneider et Cie.	1878	1	1910	né Mezidon à Dives 11
2′B n2	636–706	220-201 – 220-271	—	Batignolles (18); Saint-Léonard (5); Sharp, Stewart & Co. (12); Neilson & Co. (20); SACM (16)	1880–85	71	1918–31	rebuilt from 2-4-0s
C n2t	3001–3031	30-301 – 30-331	3-030.TB.301 – 331	Sotteville Workshops (1); Schneider et Cie. (15); Anciens Établissements Cail (15)	1883–84	31		
C n2t	3501–3602	30-101 – 30-202	3-030.TB.101 – 200	Fives-Lille (20); Franco-Belge (32); Batignolles (15); SACM (15); Anciens Établissements Cail (5); Sotteville Workshops (5)	1884–98	102		“Boers”; not renumbered in order
B n2t	M.1 – M.3	M.1 – M.3		L. Corpet	1886	3		Works locomotives with vertical boilers
2′B n2	621–635	220-101 – 220-114	—	Fives-Lille	1888	15	1925–30	rebuilt from 2-4-0s; CFO 624 exhibited at the 1889 Paris Exposition
2′B n2	939–998	220-301 – 220-360	—	Schneider et Cie. (38); Franco-Belge (12); SACM (2); CF Ouest (2)	1888–97	2		not renumbered in order
C n2	2245–2269	030-861 – 030-885	3-030.D.861 – 885	Batignolles (15); Franco-Belge (10)	1891–92	25	1934–1961	
2′B n4v	501–502	220-501 – 220-502	—	SACM	1894	2	1927–28	
2′C n2	2301–2302	230.991 – 230.992	—	Schneider et Cie.	1897	2	1933–34	
2′C n2	2303–2304	230.993 – 230.994	—	Schneider et Cie.	1897	2	1928–34	
2′B n4v	503–562	220-503 – 220-562	220.B.503 – 562	SACM (20); Wiener Neustädt (30); Sotteville Workshops (10)	1898–1901	60		
2′C n4v	2501–2540	230-101 – 230-140	3-230.A.101 – 140	SACM (10); Fives-Lille (15); Batignolles (15)	1899–1902	40		
2′C n2t	3701–3745	32-001 – 32-045	3-230.TA.1 – 45	Fives-Lille (10); Schneider et Cie. (15); StEG (20)	1897–1901	45		Temporarily renumbered État 0701–0745
1′C n2v	2305–2314	130-601 – 130-610	3-130.B.602 – 608	(rebuilt)	(1907–08)	10		rebuilt by Ouest from 0-6-0 locomotives in 1930 – 2148 series
2′C n4v	2541–2570	230-141 – 230-320	3-230.D.141 – 320	Schneider et Cie. (53); Batignolles (36); Franco-Belge (35); SACM (17); SFCM (21); Fives-Lille (18)	1909–11	180		
2′C n4v	2701–2818	230-501 – 230-618	3-230.C.501 – 618	Sotteville Workshops (20); Batignolles (15); Fives-Lille (15); SFCM (20); Borsig (25); Henschel & Sohn (23)	1901–08	118		three rebuilt as 230.M
2′C h4v	2819–2820	230-619 – 230-705	3-230.F.619 – 705	Henschel & Sohn (2); SFCM (50); Fives-Lille (35)	1908–12	87		four rebuilt as 230.M
2′C1′ n4v	2901–2902	231-001 – 231-002	—	Sotteville Workshops	1908	2	1928	Temporarily renumbered État 6001–6002
1′D n2v	4501–4530	140-001 to 140-030	3-140.A.1 – 30	Henschel & Sohn	1908	30	1935–1944	
1′C1′ n4vt	3801–3850	32-501 – 32-620	3-131.TA.501 – 620	SACM (20); SFCM (50); Fives-Lille (30); Franco-Belge (20)	1908–11	120		Temporarily renumbered État 0801–0870
Electric locomotives
Bo′Bo′	5001, 5003, 5004, 5010	(same)	—	SEECF	1900	4	by 1938	500 hp 600 V; Brown Boveri electrical equipment
Bo′Bo′	5005–5009,	(same)	—	SEECF	1900	5	by 1938	500 hp 600 V; Thomson and Westinghouse electrical equipment

== Locomotives acquired 1909–1938 ==
Type	État No. (1909 series)	SNCF No.	Manufacturer Serial numbers	Year made	Quantity made	Year(s) withdrawn	Comments
Steam locomotives
2′C1′ n4v	231-011 – 231-060	3-231.B.11 – 60	Fives-Lille (20); Schneider et Cie. (20); SFCM (10)	1910	50		“Dieppoises”; first 40 ordered as Ouest 6501–6540
1′C n2v	130-611 – 130-640	3-130.C.614 – 639	(rebuilt)	(1911–12)	30	1931–1950	Rebuilt by État from 0-6-0 locomotives in 030-531 – 030-860 series
2′C n2	230-321 – 230-370	3-230.D.232, 341, 365	North British Loco. Co.	1911	50	1932–1945	Copies of Highland Railway Castle Class
2′C	230-371 – 230-385	3-230.H.371 – 385	SACM	1912	15	1955–58	Mixed traffic version of “Jocondes”
2′C h4	230-781 – 230-800	3-230.J.781 – 800	SACM	1912	20	1953–1956	“Jocondes”; six rebuilt to 230.L
1′D h2	140-101 – 140-370	3-140.C.101 – 370	SACM (20); Schneider et Cie. (25); Fives-Lille (25); North British Loco. Co. (180); Nasmyth, Wilson & Co. (20)	1913–20	270		70 more built for the French Army; half went to the Est, half to the PLM
D n2t	40-001 – 40-143	3-040.TA.1 – 143	ANF Industrie (47); Schneider et Cie. (50); Fives-Lille (40); Sotteville (6)	1914–22	143	1959–1971	
2′C1′ h4v	231-501 – 231-783	3-231.C.501 – 783	Fives-Lille (54); Batignolles-Châtillon (140); North British Loco. Co. (45); Schneider et Cie (50)	1914–21	284		Also classes 231.D, E, F, G, H and J.
1′D h2	140-501 – 140-600, 140-1001 – 140-1045	3-140.A.501 – 600, 1001 – 1045	American Locomotive Company	1918	145	1944–1960	“Bossues”; reclassified as 140.H in 1948
1′D h2	140-1101 – 140-1510	3-140.B.1101 – 1510	Baldwin Locomotive Works	1917–19	410	1920–1953	“Pershing”. 36 to Algeria (1938–1941); 48 lost in World War II; 70 to Région Est as 1-140.B.321–390; remaining locos reclassified 140.G in 1947.
2′B n2	221-901 – 221-909		SACM (2); Maschinenbau-Gesellschaft Karlsruhe (7)	(1892–96)	(9)	1924–33	ex Baden II c, received as war reparations
2′C n4v	230-901 – 230-913	—	Grafenstaden (1); Maschinenbau-Gesellschaft Karlsruhe (12)	(1894–1900)	(13)	1929–37	ex Baden IV e, received as war reparations
2′B1 n4v	221-901 – 221-910	—	J. A. Maffei (8); Maschinenbau-Gesellschaft Karlsruhe (2)	(1902–05)	(10)	1929–34	ex Baden II d, received as war reparations
1′C1′ n4v	131-901	—	Maschinenbau-Gesellschaft Karlsruhe	(1912)	(1)	1932	ex Baden IV g, received as war reparations
1′C1′ h2t	32-901 – 32-915	3-131.TB.901 – 915	Maschinenbau-Gesellschaft Karlsruhe (6); Arnold Jung Lokomotivfabrik (9)	(1916–18)	(15)		ex Baden VI c, received as war reparations
D n2t	40-901 – 40-902	—	Maschinenbau-Gesellschaft Karlsruhe	(1918)	(2)	1936	ex Baden X b, received as war reparations
C n2	030-901 – 030-912	030.A.902 – 911	J. A. Maffei (10); Krauss (2)	(1885–94)	(12)		ex Bavarian C IV (030-910, compound; remainder simple); received as war reparations
2′C n4v	230-914 – 230-930	3-230.E.914 – 930	J. A. Maffei	(1896–1901)	(17)		ex Bavarian C V, received as war reparations
1′D n2	140-901 – 140-907	—	Krauss	(1896–1901)	(7)	c.1930	ex Bavarian E I, received as war reparations
1′D n4v	140-906	—	Baldwin Locomotive Works	(1899)	(1)	c.1930	ex Bavarian E I, Vauclain compound, received as war reparations
2′C n4v	230-931 – 230-942	2-230.E.933 – 941	J. A. Maffei	(1905–07)	(12)		ex Bavarian P 3/5 N, received as war reparations
2′C1′ h4v	231-981 – 231-996	231.A.981 – 996	J. A. Maffei	(1908–13)	(16)	1945–51	ex Bavarian S 3/6, received as war reparations
1′D h4v	140-908 – 140-955	3-140.D.906 – 955	J. A. Maffei, Krauss	(1915–19)	(48)	1937–51	ex Bavarian G 4/5 H, received as war reparations
2′C h2	230-943 – 230-959	3-230.E.934 – 958	(various)	(1908–18)	(17)		ex Prussian P 8, received as war reparations. 3-230.E.943 renumbered 1-230.F.343 in 1946
D h2	040-901 – 040-941	040.B.901 – 941	(various)	(1913–18)	(41)		ex Prussian G 8.1, received as war reparations; reclassified 040.D in 1948
1′D1′ h2t	42-901 – 42-923	3-131.TA.901 – 923	Henschel & Sohn (1); Hohenzollern (9); Union Giesserei (13)	(1915–18)	(23)		ex Prussian T 14, received as war reparations; 15 to Région Est as 1-141.TA.301 – 323; 3 sold to industry
B′B n4v	040-942 – 040-944	—	Sächsische Maschinenfabrik	(1899–1903)	(3)	1935–38	Ex Saxon I V, received as war reparations
E h2t	50-901 – 50-912	050.TA.901 – 912	Sächsische Maschinenfabrik	(1910–19)	(12)		ex Saxon XI HT, received as war reparations
2′C h2	230-960 – 230-984	3-230.E.960 – 984	Sächsische Maschinenfabrik	(1910–18)	(25)	(1948)	ex Saxon XII H2, received as war reparations
1′C1′ h2t	32-916 – 32-923	3-131.TC.916 – 923	Sächsische Maschinenfabrik	(1917–18)	(8)		ex Saxon XIV HT, received as war reparations
2′C nv	230-985 – 230-986	—	Maschinenfabrik Esslingen	(1900–02)	(2)		ex Württemberg D, received as war reparations
E n4v	050-901 – 050-903	—	Maschinenfabrik Esslingen	(1905)	(3)	1932–37	ex Württemberg H, received as war reparations
2′B h2	220-910 – 220-912	—	Maschinenfabrik Esslingen	(1908–09)	(3)		ex Württemberg ADh, received as war reparations
2′C1′ h4v	231-997 – 231-999	—	Maschinenfabrik Esslingen	(1909–14)	(3)	1937	ex Württemberg C, received as war reparations
D h2t	40-903	—	Maschinenfabrik Esslingen	(1917)	(1)	1924	ex Württemberg T 6, received as war reparations; sold to contractor in 1924
1′D1′ h2	141-001 – 141-250	3-141.B.1 – 250	Schneider et Cie. (190); SACM (60)	1921–23	250		Also class 141.C, D and E
1′D1′ h2t	42-001 – 42-020	3-141.TC.1 – 20	Fives-Lille	1923	20		
2′D1′ h4v	241-001 – 241-049	3-241.A.1 – 49	Fives-Lille (29); SFCM (10); Batignolles-Châtillon (10)	1931–35	49	1959–1963	Identical to Est 241.002 – 241.041; 10 to Région Est in 1938 as 1-241.A.108 – 137, renumbered 1-241.A.42 – 51. Région Ouest locomotives renumbered 3-241.A.301 – 339; to Est 1946–1949 as 1-241.A.52 – 90 in order of works visit.
1′D1′ h3t	42-101 – 42-140	3-141.TD.101 – 140	Schneider et Cie. (20); Batignolles-Châtillon (20)	1932	40		Copies of Est 141.701 – 141.742
2′D1′ h3	241-101	3-241.B.101	Fives-Lille	1932	1		Prototype “Super Mountain”; rebuilt to 242.A.1 in 1940
1′B1	121-401 – 121-410	3-121.A.401 – 410	SACM (6); Ivry Worksops (2); Sharp, Stewart & Co. (1); Carel Frères (1)	(1876–84)	(10)		ex PO 275…400, acquired 1934 with lines in Brittany
D n2	40-401 – 40-405	040.A.401 – 406	Ivry Workshops (4); Périgueux Workshops (2)	(1868–72)	(6)		ex PO; acquired in 1934 with lines in Brittany
C n2t	30-401 – 30-410	3-030.TC.401 – 410	Batignolles (1); Franco-Belge (7); Ivry Workshops (2)	(1891–95)	(10)		ex PO 2174…2199, acquired in 1934 with lines in Brittany
1′D1′ h2	141-401 – 141-416	3-141.A.401 – 406	Alco	(1918)	16		ex PO 5811–5826 acquired 1934 with lines in Brittany; to Région Sud-Ouest in 1947 as 4-141.B.811 – 826
2′C h2	230-401 – 230-441	3-230.K.401 – 441	SACM	(1922)	(41)		ex PO 4271–4311, acquired 1934 with lines in Brittany; surviving locomotives transferred back to Région Sud-Ouest as 230.G using the last three digits of their PO number
1′D1′ h2t	42.401 – 42-407	3-141.TB.401 – 407	Batignolles (6); SACM (1)	(1921–22)	(7)		ex PO 5665…5707, acquired in 1934 with lines in Brittany
2′C1′ n4v	231-401 to 231-420	231.C.401 – 420	Batignolles-Châtillon	(1921–22)	(20)		ex PO 3641–3660, acquired in 1934 with lines in Brittany. SNCF classes C, D, F, G, and H
2′C2′ n2t	81–93	3-232.TA.81 – 93	Société française de constructions mécaniques	1909	13		ex Ceinture, same numbers; acquired 1934 upon dissolution of the Syndicat
(C1′)(1′C) n4v	6001–6038	3-031.130.TA.1 – 38	Batignolles (32); SA John Cockerill (6)	1910–12	34		ex Ceinture, same numbers; acquired 1934 upon dissolution of the Syndicat
1′E h3	150-001 – 150-010	3-150.A.1 – 10	Fives-Lille	1936	10	1944/57–59	Identical to Est 150.001 – 150.195; to Région Est in 1949 as 1-150.E.196 – 203
2′C h2	230-491 – 230-498	3-230.K.491 – 498	Périgueux Workshops (4); Tours Workshops (4)	(1911–13)	8	1944–58	ex PO-Midi, acquired in 1937
Electric locomotives
Bo′Bo′	6001–6030	BB 811–840	Schneider / Thomson-Houston	1922	30		1100 hp 700 V Third rail, rebuilt for dual voltage (1500 V overhead) and renumbered BB 011 – 840
2′Do2′	2D2 501 – 523	2D2 5401 – 5423	Fives-Lille / CEM	1936–37	23		4160 hp 1500 V overhead, Buchli drive; based on PO 503–537
Bo′Bo′	BB 101 – 145	BB 901 – 935	Alsthom	1936–37	35		1956 hp 1500 V overhead; based on Midi 4700 series

== Preserved locomotives ==
Image	État No.	Series	SNCF No.	UIC type	Manufacturer	Serial No.	Date	Notes
	—	12-010	12-001 – 12-014	2-2-2	Alcard, Buddicom & Cie.	33	1844	ex Ouest 0133 Saint-Pierre; rebuilt from 2-2-2T in 1945. Static display, Cité du train, Mulhouse
	30-628	30-601 – 30-704	3-030.TA.628	0-6-0	Fives-Lille	1945	1873	ex Ouest 1038 Glos-Montford; Cité du train, Mulhouse
	40-137	40-001 – 40-143	3-040.TA.137	0-8-0	ANF	142	1922	Preserved by AJECTA at the Musée vivant du chemin de fer, Longueville, Seine-et-Marne, Monument historique
	40-141	40-001 – 40-143	3-040.TA.141	0-8-0	Sotteville Workshops	64	1922	
	42-019	40-001 – 42-020	3-141.TC.19	2-8-2t	Fives-Lille	4328	1923	Preserved by AJECTA at the Musée vivant du chemin de fer, Longueville, Seine-et-Marne, Monument historique
	120-036	120-021 – 120-118	3-120.A.36	2-4-0	Schneider et Cie.	2122	1882	ex État 2029 Parthenay; static exhibit, Cité du train, Mulhouse
	030-815	030-501 – 030-860	3-030.C.815	0-6-0	Wiener Neustädt	2543	1881	ex Ouest 2199; preserved at Cité du train, Mulhouse
	030-841	030-501 – 030-860	3-030.C.841	0-6-0	SACM (Graffenstaden)	3376	1883	ex Ouest 2224; preserved at Canadian Railway Museum, Delson, Quebec, Canada
	230-531	230–501 – 230-618	3-230.C.531	4-6-0	Batignolles	1541	1904	ex Ouest 2731; preserved at Château de Saint Fargeau
	231-558	231-501 – 231-783	3-231.G.558	4-6-2	Batignolles-Châtillon	57	1921	Monument historique
	140-231	140-101 – 140-370	3-140.C.231	2-8-0	North British Loco. Co.	21376	1916	Preserved with tender 18.C.482 by AJECTA at the Musée vivant du chemin de fer, Longueville, Seine-et-Marne, Monument historique
	140-287	140-101 – 140-370	3-140.C.287	2-8-0	North British Loco. Co.	21642	1917	Static display with tender 18.B.513 at Château de la Ferté, La Ferté-Saint-Aubin, then in 2015 by Association pour la Préservation du Patrimoine et des Métiers Ferroviaires (APPMF) in Gièvres to be restored.
	140-313	140-101 – 140-370	3-140.C.313	2-8-0	North British Loco. Co.	21650	1917	Static display, Reims railway station
	140-314	140-101 – 140-370	3-140.C.314	2-8-0	North British Loco. Co.	21651	1917	Preserved by the Chemin de fer touristique du Vermandois (CFVT) and is used on its line.
	140-344	140-101 – 140-370	3-140.C.344	2-8-0	North British Loco. Co.	21581	1917	Located in Cité du train, Mulhouse
	141-100	141-001 – 141-250	3-141.C.100	2-8-2	Schneider et Cie.	3729	1920	Monument historique
	241-001	241-001 – 241-049	3-241.A.1; 3-241.A.301; 1-241.A.65	4-8-2	Fives-Lille	4714	1931	241A65 is preserved in working order in Switzerland & 241A1 is on static display in Cité du train in Mulhouse.
