= État 42-001 to 42-020 =

Class of steam locomotives

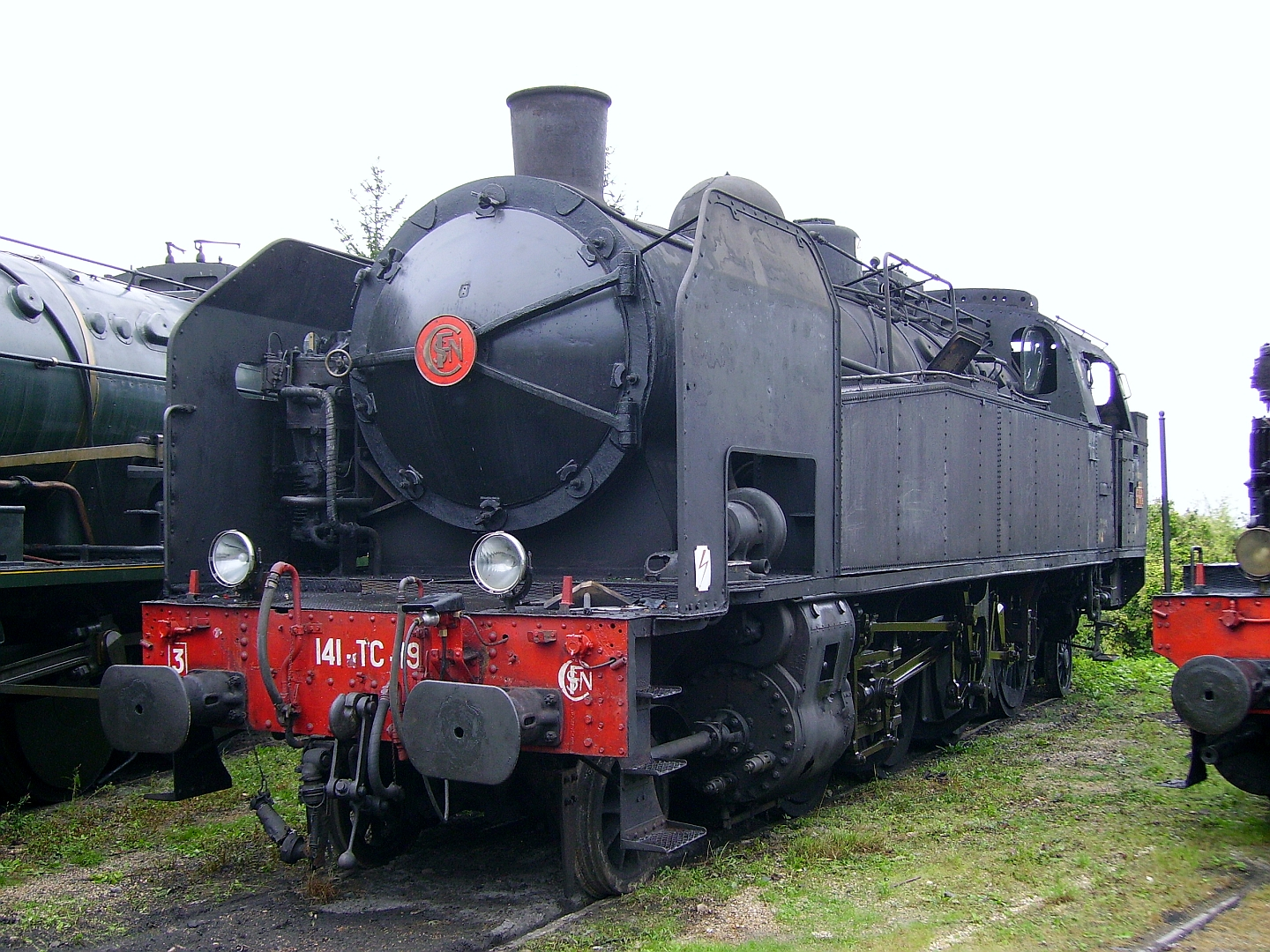
- 3-141.TC.19 at Longueville, 16 September 2006.
Type and origin
- Power type: Steam
- Builder: Fives-Lille
- Serial number: 4310–4329
- Build date: 1923
- Total produced: 20
Specifications
- Configuration
  - Whyte: 2-8-2T
  - UIC: 1′D1′ h2t
- Gauge: 1,435 mm (4 ft 8 1/2 in)
- Driver dia.: 1,540 mm (5 ft 0.63 in)
- Loco weight: 96.2 tonnes (94.7 long tons; 106.0 short tons)
- Fuel type: Coal
- Fuel capacity: 4 tonnes (3.9 long tons; 4.4 short tons)
- Water cap.: 8,500 litres (1,900 imp gal; 2,200 US gal)
- Firebox
  - Grate area: 2.80 m^{2} (30.1 sq ft)
- Boiler pressure: Originally: 12 kg/cm^{2} (1.18 MPa; 171 psi); Later: 13 kg/cm^{2} (1.27 MPa; 185 psi)
- Heating surface: 169.91 m^{2} (1,828.9 sq ft)
- Superheater
  - Heating area: 49.5 m^{2} (533 sq ft)
- Cylinders: Two, outside
- Cylinder size: 600 mm × 650 mm (23.62 in × 25.59 in)
Performance figures
- Power output: 897 kW (1,203 hp)
Career
- Operators: Chemins de Fer de l'État → SNCF
- Class: SNCF: 3-141.TC
- Numbers: État: 42-001 to 40-020; SNCF 141.TC.1 to 141.TC.20
- Preserved: One: 141.TC.19

État 42-001 to 42-020, was a class of 2-8-2 Tank locomotives of the Chemins de Fer de l'État.

== Design ==
Studies were led in parallel with those of the 140 C. The 42-000s were of simple expansion with two cylinders and possessed the powerful fireboxes of the 140-100s. Although the fireboxes were excellent, the rest was of average quality with cylinders particularly of small diameter (250 mm or 9.8 in). The Chemin de fer de l'État chose small wheels to give the engines the capacity for quick acceleration. The railway company was very satisfied with the engines as they were capable of hauling the heavy steel coaches.

== Construction ==
This series of 20 engines, numbered 42-001 to 42-020, was built by Fives-Lille and was allocated to the Batignolles motive power depot. Although they were designed in 1913, production was delayed by World War I until 1923, when the Chemins de Fer de l'État took delivery.

== Service ==
They were designed to serve in the western suburbs of Paris. In 1930, the engines were equipped with for push-pull operation. The driver could operate the engine from the driving cabin of a Voiture État à 2 étages carriage at the other end of the train, using compressed-air pipes. This saved much time at terminals. The engines were modified, primarily with the addition of a smoke deflector and a closed cab. The 42-000s were renumbered 3-141.TC 1 to 20 by the SNCF in 1938.

The electrification of the Réseau Saint-Lazare moved the engines to Brittany. The last of the series were allocated to the St-Brieux depot and rented to the Société générale de chemins de fer et de transport automobile (CFTA) after Réseau Breton lines between Carhaix and Paimpol had been re-gauged from metre gauge to standard gauge. The last 141.TC was withdrawn in 1971.

== Preservation ==
One locomotive has been preserved: 42-019, later SNCF 3-141.TC.19 (Fives-Lille 4328 of 1923) is preserved by AJECTA at the Musée vivant du chemin de fer in Longueville, Seine-et-Marne, and has been designated a Monument historique.
