= Nord 3.401 to 3.512 =

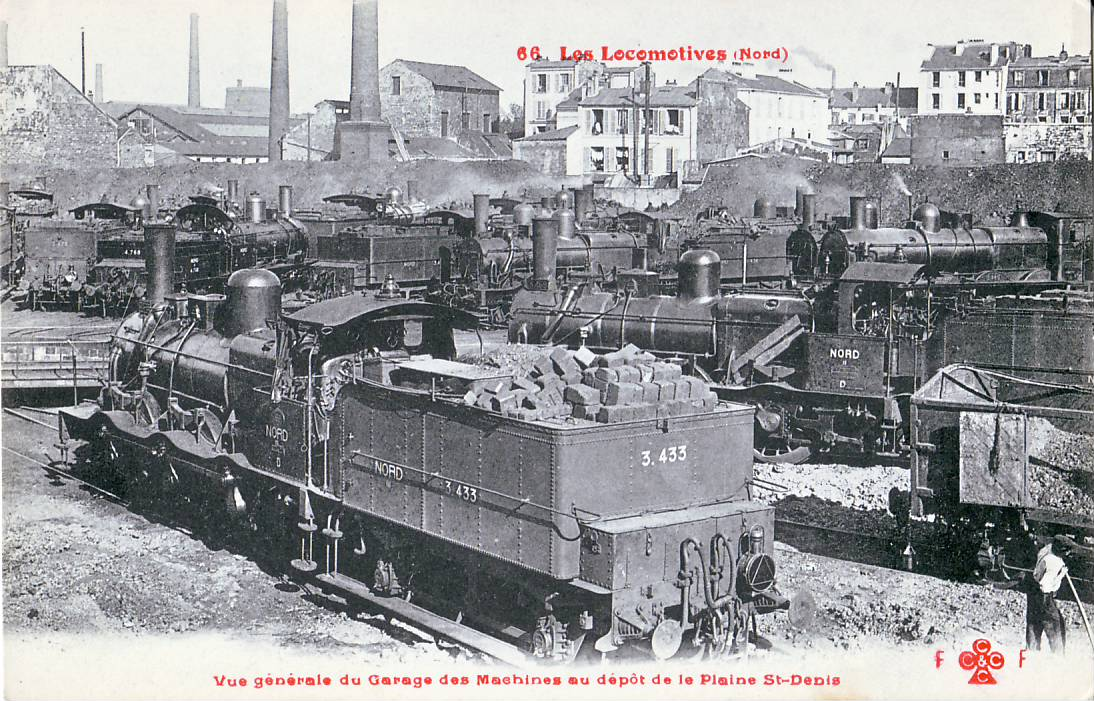
- Nord 3.433 from the first ordered batch (3.401 to 3.472) at the Dépot de la Plaine Saint-Denis
Type and origin
- Power type: Steam
- Build date: 1883–1886 (3.401–3.472); 1890–1891 (3.473–3.512)
- Total produced: 112
Specifications
- Configuration
  - Whyte: 0-6-0
  - UIC: C n2
- Gauge: 1,435 mm (4 ft 8 1/2 in)
- Driver dia.: 1,664 mm (5 ft 5 1/2 in)
- Wheelbase: 4.10 m (13 ft 5 1/2 in)
- Length: 8.70 m (28 ft 7 in)
- Loco weight: 40 t (88,200 lb)
- Fuel type: Coal
- Firebox
  - Type: Belpaire
  - Grate area: 2.41 m^{2} (25.9 sq ft)
- Boiler pressure: 10–11.5 kg/cm^{2} (0.981–1.13 MPa; 142–164 psi)
- Heating surface: 99–136 m^{2} (1,070–1,460 sq ft)
- Cylinders: Two, inside
- Cylinder size: 450 mm or 480 mm × 610 mm (17 11/16 in or 18 7/8 in × 24 in)
- Valve gear: Stephenson
Career
- Operators: Chemins de Fer du Nord
- Numbers: Nord: 3.401 – 3.512
- Preserved: One: Nord 3.486

Nord 3.401 à 3.512 were 0-6-0 locomotives for mixed traffic of the Chemins de Fer du Nord. The locomotive class served for more than 50 years, with the last locomotive, Nord 3.486, retiring in 1936.

== Construction history ==
The design was based on the preceding Nord 3.021 to 3.075 class. The locomotives were built in two series by various manufacturers.

| Series | Nord No. | Year | Qty. | Manufacturer No. |
|---|---|---|---|---|
| 3.401–3.472 (1883–1886) | 3.401–3.436 | 1883 | 36 | SACM / Mulhouse No. 3465-3500 |
| 3.401–3.472 (1883–1886) | 3.437–3.452 | 1884 | 16 | SACM / Mulhouse No. 3601-3616 |
| 3.401–3.472 (1883–1886) | 3.453–3.467 | 1885–1886 | 15 | Nord / La Chapelle |
| 3.401–3.472 (1883–1886) | 3.468–3.472 | 1886 | 5 | Nord / Hellemmes |
| 3.473–3.512 (1890–1891) | 3.473–3.492 | 1890 | 20 | SACM / Belfort No. 4217-4236 |
| 3.473–3.512 (1890–1891) | 3.493–3.512 | 1890 | 20 | Schneider-Creusot No. 2468-2487 |

== Service history ==
The locomotives were used to operate many of the Chemins de Fer du Nord's railway lines, passenger trains as well as freight trains.

In 1914 three locomotives stationed in the depot Tergenier, Nord 3.414, 3.418 and 3.508, were lost due to World War I. In the period of 1915-1917 the locomotives then were confined to the depots La Chapelle, La Plaine, Creil, Hazebrouck, Dunkerque, Calais, Amiens, Boulogne, Compiègne, Longueau, Béthune, Abbeville and Valenciennes.

In 1918 a locomotive of this series, the Nord 3.438, was used to pull the Armistice train to the Forest of Compiègne.

Early 1920 to 1925 the locomotives were then allocated to the depots La Plaine (4), Creil (3), Crépy (2), Soissons (2), Compiègne (8), Estrées (4), Somain (18), Arras, Délivrance (1), Amiens (7), Longueau (2), Le Tréport (12), Beauvais (3), Cambrai (8), Hirson (11) and Hazebrouck (26).

In 1936 the last operational locomotive of the series, the Nord 3.486, retired.
