= État 231-501 to 231-783 =

Class of steam locomotives

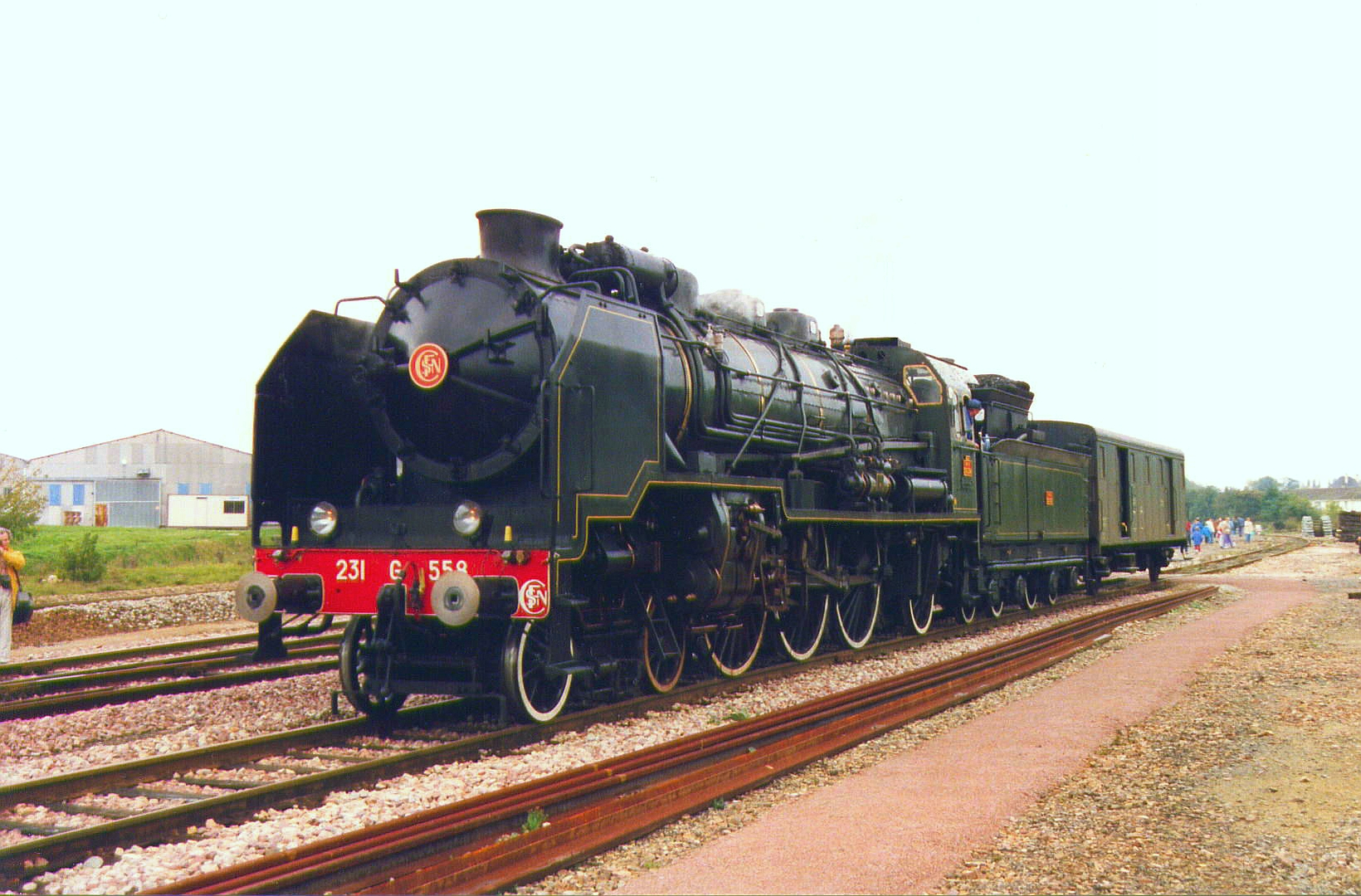
- Locomotive 231.G.558 in Bayeux, Calvados in October 1993
Type and origin
- Power type: Steam
- Builder: Fives-Lille (54), Batignolles-Châtillon (140), North British Locomotive Co. (45); Schneider et Cie. (50)
- Build date: 1914–1921
- Total produced: 289
Specifications
- Configuration
  - Whyte: 4-6-2
  - UIC: 2′C1′ h4v
- Gauge: 1,435 mm (4 ft 8 1/2 in)
- Leading dia.: 960 mm (37.80 in)
- Driver dia.: 1,950 mm (76.77 in)
- Trailing dia.: 1,230 mm (48.43 in)
- Length: 13.66 m (44 ft 10 in)
- Adhesive weight: 56 tons
- Total weight: 152 tons
- Fuel type: Coal
- Fuel capacity: 9 or 12 tons
- Firebox
  - Grate area: 4.27 m^{2} (46.0 sq ft)
- Boiler pressure: 16 kg/cm^{2} (1.57 MPa; 228 psi)
- Heating surface: 211.9 m^{2} (2,281 sq ft)
- Superheater
  - Heating area: 63.5 m^{2} (684 sq ft)
- Cylinders: Four, two high pressure, two low pressure
- High-pressure cylinder: 420 mm × 650 mm (16.54 in × 25.59 in)
- Low-pressure cylinder: 650 mm × 650 mm (25.59 in × 25.59 in)
Performance figures
- Maximum speed: 130 km/h (81 mph)
Career
- Operators: Chemins de Fer de l'État → SNCF
- Class: SNCF: 231 C, 231 F, 231 G, 231 H, 231 J
- Numbers: État: 231-501 to 231-783
- Preserved: One (231 G 558)
- Disposition: One preserved, remainder scrapped

État 231-500 to 231-783 was a series of 4-6-2 steam locomotives of the Chemin de fer de l'État ("the État").

289 engines of this series were built starting in 1914, with deliveries from 1916 through 1923. They replaced and supplemented the 231 B that had a tendency to derail. The class was numbered 231-501 to 231-783 by the État and 231.C.501 to 231.C.783 by the SNCF; with class letters "C" through "H" used depending on the level of rebuilding and modernisation.

The first locomotives were built by Fives-Lille; however only the first locomotive had entered service before the city of Lille was overrun by the advancing German Army during World War I. Five others were seized by the Germans. Subsequently, orders were placed with the North British Locomotive Company of Scotland for 40 locomotives. Five of these were lost when the cargo ship carrying them was sunk during an attack by a German submarine; they were later replaced by construction of new locomotives. Post-war production was with Fives-Lille, Schneider et Cie., and the newly founded Compagnie générale de Construction de locomotives (Batignolles-Châtillon). Four of the five taken away by the Germans returned to the État after the end of the war, and were given numbers at the end of the class-list. The fifth locomotive went to the Chemins de Fer du Nord, where it was numbered 3.1150; the SNCF renumbered it 2-231.B.1 until 1947 when it was transferred to the Région Ouest and renumbered 3-231.F.784.

The engines were famous for their service on passenger trains, notably on the Paris-Le Havre and Paris-Le Mans-Rennes expresses.

After World War I other companies received 231-500s thanks to government aid. They were designated 231 TP for Travaux Publics (Public Works), the former name of the Ministry of Transport.

The 231 G was rated at 2,200 hp (1,600 kW). Engine 231-523 was modified in 1929 from four cylinders to three, and had Lentz valves fitted.

== 231 G in preservation ==
231 G 558 was a Pacific engine of the État, built in 1922. It had a career pulling express passenger trains on the Paris-Chartres-Bordeaux, Paris-Niort, Paris-Saintes, Paris-Cherbourg, and Paris-Le Havre runs. It ended its career on the run between Nantes and Le Croisic, and pulled its last train on 29 September 1968 when it was moved to Angers. In 1969 it was used in Dieppe as a heater for ferries. The SNCF wished to sell the engine for scrap in 1971, but the depot manager in Sotteville got the engine transferred to his depot in 1972. After five years of campaigning, the engine was sold to the depot staff for the token price of one franc. The engine was listed for preservation on 4 June 1984. After 8,000 man-hours of work, the engine was made fit for mainline use. The engine was reviewed and received its timbre, a stamp showing the pressure of the boiler, on 28 November 1985 and was certified for mainline use on 30 May 1986. The Princess, as it is nicknamed, made its first run to Paris on 29 June 1986.

In the summer of 2007, 231 G 558 could be found running daily on the branch line between Paimpol and Pontrieux in northern Brittany.

== See also ==
- List of Chemins de Fer de l'État locomotives
