= Réseau Saint-Lazare =

Réseau Saint-Lazare seen within the French rail network.

Réseau Saint-Lazare (French pronunciation: [ʁezo sɛ̃ lazaʁ]) is the network of railway lines originating from Saint Lazare Station in Paris. The network stretches from Paris to Normandy and encompasses suburban services. Parisian suburban rail services are operated under SNCF's brand name Transilien. Intercity services are also operated by SNCF but under the brand name Corail.

== Track ==
Cohabitation of both intercity and suburban rail did cause problems. Junctions were not carefully planned, and extensions were simply grafted onto the existing network. The Chemins de fer de l'Ouest's suburban network was particularly touched by problems of cohabitation on the line and at stations since it had the largest suburban network in France. The problem resided in the fact that lines crossed each other, creating unnecessary bottlenecks and hold ups. In 1880, the Chemins de fer de l'Ouest operated four lines out of Saint-Lazare: the lines to Versailles Rive Droite and Argenteuil separated at Asnières whilst the lines to Saint-Germain and Rouen separated at Colombes. As they were, both lines to Argenteuil crossed those to Saint-Germain and Rouen at Asnières. The Chemins de Fer de l'Ouest thus decided create a spur, opened in 1891, from Bécon-les-Bruyères and La Garenne-Colombes. In 1892, the line to Saint-Germain was rerouted to a spur of the line to Versailles instead of the line to Poissy whilst the line to Poissy was rerouted to a spur of the line to Argenteuil, avoiding crossings. The bridge over the River Seine still had four tracks, but serving two pairs of lines. These modifications were only sufficient for a time as traffic was in constant increase, growing from 26 million passengers in 1888 to 42 million in 1898. The tunnel at Batignoles (now Pont Cardinet) was another bottleneck, so a fourth tunnel was built, but later demolished along with all save one tunnel in 1912. At that time, the Chemin de fer de l'État possessed eight tracks leaving Saint-Lazare, which were split into four groups:

- Groupe I: Auteuil
- Groupe II: Versailles
- Groupe III: Saint-Germain
- Germain IV: Normandy

The eight tracks were supplemented by two sidings, used to transfer rolling stock and locomotives, as well as a second bridge at Asnières. World War I slowed expansion and the second bridge was only built in 1921, the year when a grave accident occurred in the Batignoles tunnel and precipitated its demolition. The demolition of the tunnels as well as the transfer of the terminus of the line to Auteuil at Pont Cardinet freed up platforms at Saint-Lazare and increased tracks in the tranchée des Batignoles from eight to ten and split in five groups:

- Groupe I: Auteuil, leaving Pont Cardinet
- Groupe II: Versailles
- Groupe III: Saint-Germain
- Groupe IV: Argenteuil
- Groupe V: Mantes, via Poissy
- Groupe VI: Mantes, via Conflans

An eleventh track, used for servicing, was built for reversing locomotives. The pont d'Asnières was widened to accommodate the ten tracks. A saut-de-mouton (flying junction) was built between Asnières and Bois-Colombes to avoid the crossing of the groupe IV and groupe V lines.

Two joining lines were built in 1923 and 1925 at La Folie and Bezons to relieve suburban lines from goods services. The station building at Bois-Colombes was rebuilt above the railway line in 1934 as well as the quadrupling of the line as well as replacement of all the remaining level crossings by bridges or underpasses between 1933 and 1935. The line was also rebuilt on a 585 m long viaduct between Bois-Colombes and Le Stade (Gennevilliers). Other modernisation projects included the electrification of the Réseau Saint-Lazare.

== Electrification ==
=== Third rail electrification ===
The Chemins de fer de l'Ouest had hoped to electrify parts of its lines to Saint-Germain and Argenteuil as early as 1908. Many of the construction work on the lines were initiated to alleviate operational issues but steam traction meant that without remote driving or the locomotive, engines had to be turned around the train at termini. Third rail electrification had been applied to Paris' underground and the Chemin de fer de Paris à Orléans's line from Les Invalides with success.

Rolling stock chosen were two carriage 22m long EMUs of Z 1300 class resting on two bogies and compatible with rolling stock used on the line at Les Invalides. 1500 V overhead electrification had been dismissed by the French Government following World War I and so 650 V third rail electrification was chosen. A special commission had found that the Réseau État Saint-Lazare was in need of electrification on the railway lines to Saint-Germain, Versailles Rive Droite, Saint-Nom-la-Bretèche, Puteaux, Issy-les-Moulineaux and Argenteuil. The Chemins de fer de l'Ouest and then the Chemin de fer de l'État from 1909 had worked towards that goal by simplifying track layout in Paris' close suburbs.

On 24 April 1924, the third rail was switched on groupe II on the 6 km section between Paris and Bécon-les-Bruyères and on groupe IV on the 6 km section between Paris and Bois-Colombes. The press as well as the public saluted the arrival of the electric train which made some steam hauled trains look old. Indeed, some coaches in use were old 19th century double-deck passenger cars with notorious comfort. The rames standard was capable of carrying 372 seated passengers and were capable of being coupled together. They were stabled at Rueil-Malmaison, Bois-Colombes and Champ de Mars and servicing was performed at La Folie.

The 7 km long railway line to Auteuil was electrified in January 1925. The line to Saint-Germain-en-Laye was electrified up to Rueil-Malmaison (14 km) in June 1926, then extended to Saint-Germain in 1927. The line to Versailles Rive Droite was electrified in July 1928 as well as between Puteaux and Issy-les-Moulineaux, Saint-Nom-la-Bretèche in May 1931 and the 10 km long line to Argenteuil in 1936 after the quadrupling of the tracks two years earlier.

Electricity was fed to the EMUs under the third rail, as opposed to above the rail in Southern England. The third rail was fed by fourteen sub-stations themselves fed by 15000 V and 1500 V by power stations at Nanterre and Issy-les-Moulineaux. the sub-stations was partially automated in the early 1930s.

When electrification was implemented, zoned services were put in place to decrease travel time, this meant that not all trains served all stations and semi-direct trains served the further stations. This decreased travel time for users of further town. From 1926, three trains served the Saint-Germain line:

- Saint Lazare-Bécon omnibus every fifteen minutes
- Saint Lazare-Bécon direct then omnibus to Rueil every half-hour
- Saint Lazare-Rueil direct then omnibus to Saint-Germain every half-hour (steam operated until 1927)

To maximise electrification efficiency, Bloc automatique lumineux signalling (BAL) tested between Rueil-Malmaison and Le Pecq followed by a widespread implementation on all the close suburb between 1924 and 1931.

=== Overhead electrification ===
Allied bombing in 1944 destroyed much of the railway installations and disorganised services. Operated by the SNCF since 1938, Réseau Saint-Lazare, like Réseau Nord and Réseau Est was to be electrified with overhead wire. As it had been the case with other modernisation projects, track alteration took place when it was being prepared for electrification. A fourth track was installed between Achères and Poissy in 1961 as well as a saut-de-mouton and an intermediate terminus at Poissy. A fourth track was also installed on a 6 km long stretch of line between Vernouillet and Les Mureaux. Stations at Sartrouville and Les Mureaux were expanded and a through track installed for suburban services.

25 kV electrification by overhead wiring was made live on groupe V in 1966, on 11 January between Achères and Mantes for use for goods services only and on 20 September between Gare Saint-Lazare and Achères for suburban passenger services alike.

To prepare for the arrival of overhead electrification, important structural work was done. Initiated in 1962, work ended in 1966. It included the raising of the bridge of the Place de l'Europe situated above the platforms at Gare Saint-Lazare and lowering the tracks below the bâtiment des docks, offices situated above high numbered platforms, lengthening of the platforms allocated to intercity services and the construction of the state of the art signal box, poste tout relais à transit souple (PRS). Electricity was switched on the line to Mantes via Conflans on 27 March 1967 and from Conflans to Pontoise on 14 May 1968.

== Rolling stock ==
As a heritage of the Chemins de fer de l'Ouest and the Chemin de fer de l'État and due to its size, the Réseau Saint-Lazare inherited a number of particular and specifically designed rolling stock.

=== Steam traction ===
The following locomotives were in use for passenger duties on the Réseau Saint-Lazare:

- 030 T Ouest
- 040 TA Ouest
- 120 T Ouest
- 131 TA Ouest
- 141 TC Ouest
- 141 TD Ouest

=== Electric traction ===
The following rolling stock is in use for passenger duties on the Réseau Saint-Lazare:

- SNCF Class BB 16000
- SNCF Class BB 16500
- SNCF Class BB 17000
- SNCF Class BB 26000

Including some electric multiple units:

- SNCF Class Z 1300
- SNCF Class Z 1500
- SNCF Class Z 6300
- SNCF Class Z 6400
- SNCF Class Z 20500
- SNCF TGV Réseau

=== Diesel traction ===
Since the electrification of the main line to Caen and Cherbourg in June 1996, there no longer are regular services using diesel for Gare Saint-Lazare although some regional services in Normandy, part of the Réseau Saint-Lazare use DMUs and diesel locomotives.

- SNCF Class BB 67400
- SNCF Class T 1000
- SNCF Class T 2000
- SNCF Class X 4630
- SNCF Class X 72500
- SNCF Class X 73500

=== Hauled stock ===
- Bidel passenger cars
- Voiture État à 2 étages 1933-1984
- Rame inox de banlieue 1970–present
- Voiture de banlieue à 2 niveaux 1975–present

== Depots ==
Trains operating in the Réseau Saint Lazare are maintained in several engine sheds or EMT:

- Bâtignoles (Grandes-Lignes)
- Clichy-Levallois (Transilien)
  - Asnières-sur-Seine (Transilien)
- Achères
  - Mantes-la-Jolie (Freight & Transilien)
- Sotteville
- Caen
