= Nord 3.021 to 3.075 =

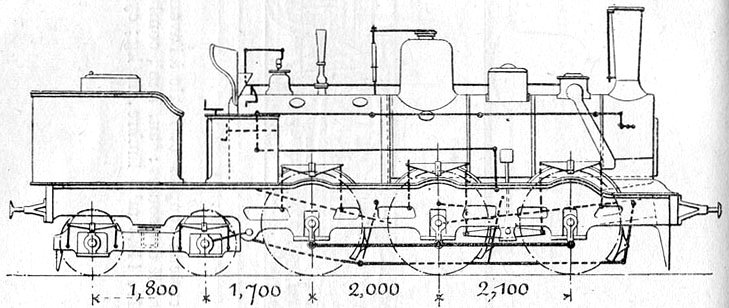
Type and origin
- Power type: Steam
- Designer: Édouard Delebecque
- Builder: SACM – Belfort
- Build date: 1880–1883
- Total produced: 55
Specifications
- Configuration
  - Whyte: 0-6-4
  - UIC: C2' n2t
- Gauge: 1,435 mm (4 ft 8 1/2 in)
- Driver dia.: 1,664 mm (5 ft 5 1/2 in)
- Trailing dia.: 1,040 mm (3 ft 5 in)
- Wheelbase: 7.6 m (24 ft 11 1/4 in)
- Length: 11.36 m (37 ft 3 in)
- Adhesive weight: 36.5 t (80,500 lb)
- Loco weight: 54 t (119,000 lb)
- Fuel type: Coal
- Fuel capacity: 2.4 t (5,290 lb)
- Water cap.: 5 m^{3} (177 cu ft)
- Firebox
  - Type: Belpaire
  - Grate area: 2.41 m^{2} (25.9 sq ft)
- Boiler pressure: 10–11.5 kg/cm^{2} (0.981–1.13 MPa; 142–164 psi)
- Heating surface: 99–136 m^{2} (1,070–1,460 sq ft)
- Cylinders: Two, inside
- Cylinder size: 450 mm × 610 mm (17 11/16 in × 24 in)
- Valve gear: Stephenson
Performance figures
- Power output: 660 CV (485 kW; 651 hp)
- Tractive effort: 8,537 kg (18,800 lb)
Career
- Operators: Chemins de Fer du Nord
- Numbers: Nord: 3.021 – 3.075
- Nicknames: Courte-Queue

Nord 3.021 to 3.075 were 0-6-4 tank locomotives for mixed traffic of the Chemins de Fer du Nord.

== Construction history ==
The locomotives were built from 1880 to 1883 by the Société Alsacienne de Constructions Mécaniques (SACM) in Belfort. Many constructive details of the boiler and the mechanisms were of a similar design as the preceding the Nord 2.800 class Outrance express locomotives, also a double frame chassis was used. The locomotives themselves also were the precursors of the Nord 3.401 to 3.512 locomotive series, with which they shared many constructive details. The machines were retired from service from 1932 to 1935.

The locomotives had a Belpaire firebox which extended over the last driving axle and had a firebox area of 2.33 m^{2} (25.1 sq ft). The boiler consisted of three shells with an average diameter of 1.24 m (4 ft 7/8 in). The cylinders, with a size of 432 mm × 610 mm (17 in × 24 in), were mounted in an inclined position inside of the frame and were controlled by a Stephenson valve gear.
