= État 230-781 to 230-800 =

État 230-781 to 230-800 SNCF 3-230.J → L
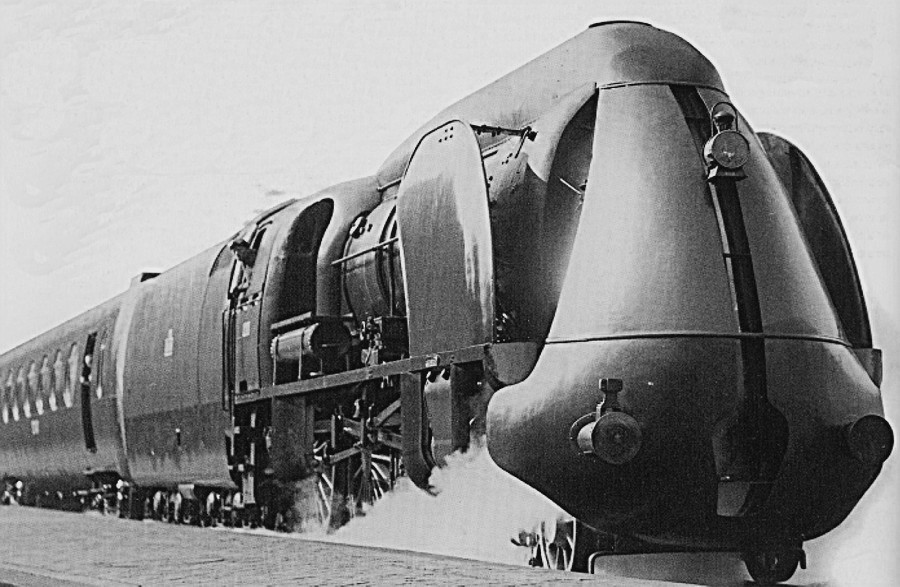
- État 230 800 in Paris Saint-Lazare, 1937.
Type and origin
- Power type: Steam
- Builder: SACM, Belfort
- Serial number: 6366–6385
- Build date: 1912
- Total produced: 20
Specifications
- Configuration
  - Whyte: 4-6-0
  - UIC: 2′C h4
- Gauge: 1,435 mm (4 ft 8 1/2 in)
- Driver dia.: 2,040 mm (6 ft 8.31 in)
- Length: 20.445 m (67 ft 0.9 in)
- Adhesive weight: 46 tonnes (45 long tons; 51 short tons)
- Loco weight: 71.5 tonnes (70.4 long tons; 78.8 short tons)
- Tender weight: 53.5 tonnes (52.7 long tons; 59.0 short tons)
- Fuel type: Coal
- Fuel capacity: 6 tonnes (5.9 long tons; 6.6 short tons)
- Water cap.: 21,000 litres (4,600 imp gal; 5,500 US gal)
- Firebox
  - Grate area: 2.78 sq ft (0.258 m^{2})
- Boiler pressure: 12 kg/cm^{2} (1.18 MPa; 171 psi)
- Heating surface: 136.10 m^{2} (1,465.0 sq ft)
- Superheater
  - Heating area: 43.03 m^{2} (463.2 sq ft)
- Cylinders: Four, simple
- Cylinder size: 430 mm × 640 mm (16.93 in × 25.20 in)
Performance figures
- Power output: 880 kW (1,180 hp)
Career
- Operators: Chemin de fer de l'État → SNCF
- Class: SNCF: 3-230.J and L
- Numbers: 230-781 to 230-800
- Nicknames: Jocondes

État 230-781 to 230-800 was a small class of 4-6-0 steam locomotives of the Chemin de fer de l'État.

The series of 20 engines was built by the Belfort works of SACM in 1912 with 2.040 m diameter wheels. They were coupled with 21 cubic metre tenders. These machines, liked by drivers of the Chemin de fer de l'État, were nicknamed Jocondes.

The engines, numbered 230-781 to 230-800 with the Chemin de fer de l'État were renumbered 3-230.J.781 to 800 by the SNCF in 1938.

== Modifications ==
Three locomotives (781, 783, and 793) received ACFI feedwater heaters. In 1933, two locomotives (788 and 793) were fitted with Kylälä exhausts.

Between 1936 and 1937, six locomotives (783, 788, 792, 793, 796, and 800) modified with long-travel valves and Kylchap exhausts. Two also received boilers uprated to 14 kg/cm^{2} (1.37 MPa; 199 psi), increasing the power output to 930 kilowatts (1,250 hp). One locomotive (800) was also streamlined, but the streamlined casing was removed during World War II.

These six modified locomotives had their class letter changed from "J" to "L".

All except two were retired and scrapped between 1953 and 1954. The last two, 3-230.L.788 and 3-230.L.793 were scrapped in 1956. None are preserved.

A main source for information on these steam locomotives is: "Railway Magazine for February 1938" from which the following is taken: As a result of test carried out on one-tenth scale models of a French State Railways Pacific locomotive in the Lafarge wind tunnel of the " Insitut Aérotechnique de Saint-Cyr", a number of modified 4-6-0 locomotives for use on light fast trains have been fitted with Huet deflector plates which serves the dual purpose of smoke lifting and maintaining a sheath-like air flow along the body of the locomotive, taking the place of a streamlined metal casing.
