= État 141-001 to 141-250 =

Class of steam locomotives

État 141-001 to 141-250 SNCF 3-141.B → C
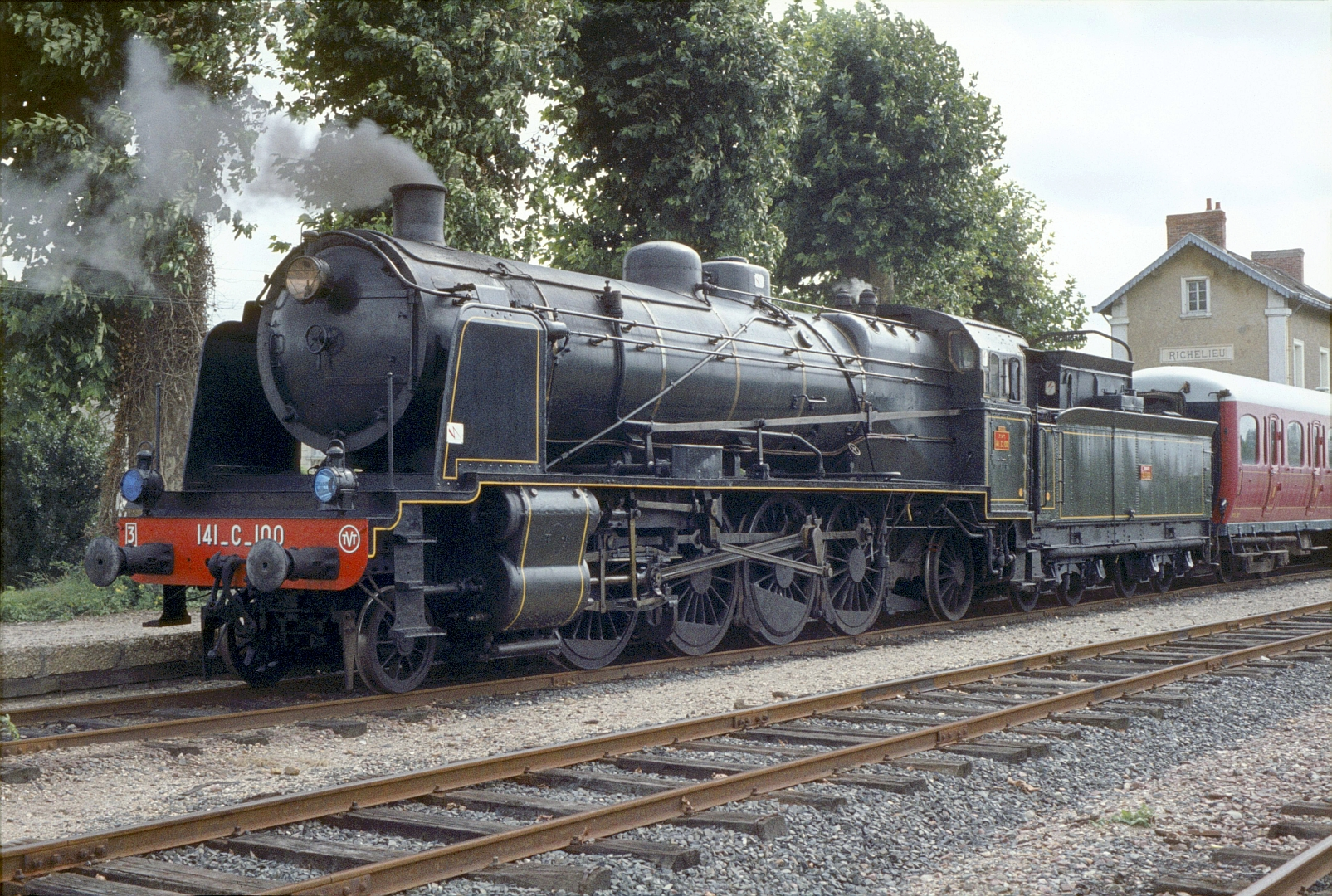
- 141.C.100 on the Train à Vapeur de Touraine heritage railway, 28 August 1983
Type and origin
- Power type: Steam
- Builder: Schneider et Cie. (190); SACM (60)
- Build date: 1921–1923
- Total produced: 250
Specifications
- Configuration
  - Whyte: 2-8-2
  - UIC: 1′D1′ h2
- Gauge: 1,435 mm (4 ft 8 1/2 in)
- Leading dia.: 850 mm (33.46 in)
- Driver dia.: 1,650 mm (64.96 in)
- Trailing dia.: 1,250 mm (49.21 in)
- Length: 13 m (42 ft 8 in)
- Adhesive weight: 67.8 t
- Loco weight: 87.0 tonnes (85.6 long tons; 95.9 short tons)
- Tender weight: 54.6 tonnes (53.7 long tons; 60.2 short tons)
- Fuel type: Coal
- Fuel capacity: 9 or 12 tonnes
- Water cap.: 22,000 litres (4,800 imp gal; 5,800 US gal)
- Tender cap.: 7.0 tonnes (6.9 long tons; 7.7 short tons)
- Firebox
  - Grate area: 3.87 m^{2} (41.7 sq ft)
- Boiler pressure: 12 kg/cm^{2} (1.18 MPa; 171 psi), later 14 kg/cm^{2} (1.37 MPa; 199 psi)
- Heating surface: 207.37 m^{2} (2,232.1 sq ft)
- Superheater
  - Heating area: 46.35 m^{2} (498.9 sq ft)
- Cylinders: Two, outside
- Cylinder size: 630 mm × 700 mm (24.80 in × 27.56 in)
Performance figures
- Maximum speed: 100 km/h (62 mph)
- Power output: 1,700 hp (1,268 kW)
Career
- Operators: Chemins de Fer de l'État → SNCF
- Class: SNCF: 3-141.C
- Numbers: État: 141-001 to 141-250; SNCF: 140.B.1 to 140.B.250 later 140.C.1 to 140.C.250
- Preserved: One: 141.C.100

État 141-001 to 141-250 was a series of 2-8-2 steam locomotives of the Chemins de Fer de l'État.

== Overview ==
The series of 250 engines, numbered 141-001 to 141-250 were built in 1921. They were renumbered 141.B.001 to 141.B.250 by the SNCF in 1938 and ended their career in the West of France at the end of the 1960s.

Table of orders
Year	Manufacturer	Serial nos.	État nos.	SNCF nos.	Notes
1920	Schneider et Cie.	3630–3739	141-001 – 141-110	3-141.B.1 – 110	
1921–1922	Schneider et Cie.	3740–3819	141-111 – 141-190	3-141.B.111 – 110	
1923	SACM (Graffenstaden)	7232–7291	141-191 – 141-250	3-141.B.191 – 250	

== Design ==
The engines were capable of a speed of up 100 km/h (62 mph). Their light weight per axle made them capable of hauling both passenger and goods trains on most of the Chemins de Fer de l'État's network and of the former Chemins de Fer de l'Ouest. Due to the need of a simple to operate and solid locomotive, the Chemins de Fer de l'État even went to choose the pressure of the boiler (or timbre in French). The pressure was 12 kp/cm^{2} or 12 hectopièzes (old units of measurement, 1.2 MPa in modern units), this enabled the machine to develop an output of 1,540 hp (1,150 kW) at 60 km/h and 830 hp (620 kW) at 100 km/h. From 1932 the timbre was increased to 14 kp/m^{2} to obtain a power of 1,700 hp (1,300 kW) at 60 km/h and 1,160 hp (870 kW) at 100 km/h; locomotives were recoded from "B" to "C" as this work was done.

141.C.50 was rebuilt at Sotteville-lès-Rouen in 1928. This depot was built by the British and was the largest of the Chemins de Fer de l'Ouest (part of the État from 1908). There it received new Renaud type valves, saving 9.8% coal. It also received a Kylchap exhaust.

== Preservation ==
One locomotive has been preserved: 141.C.100 (and tender 22.B.609) are in working order and are listed as a Monument historique.

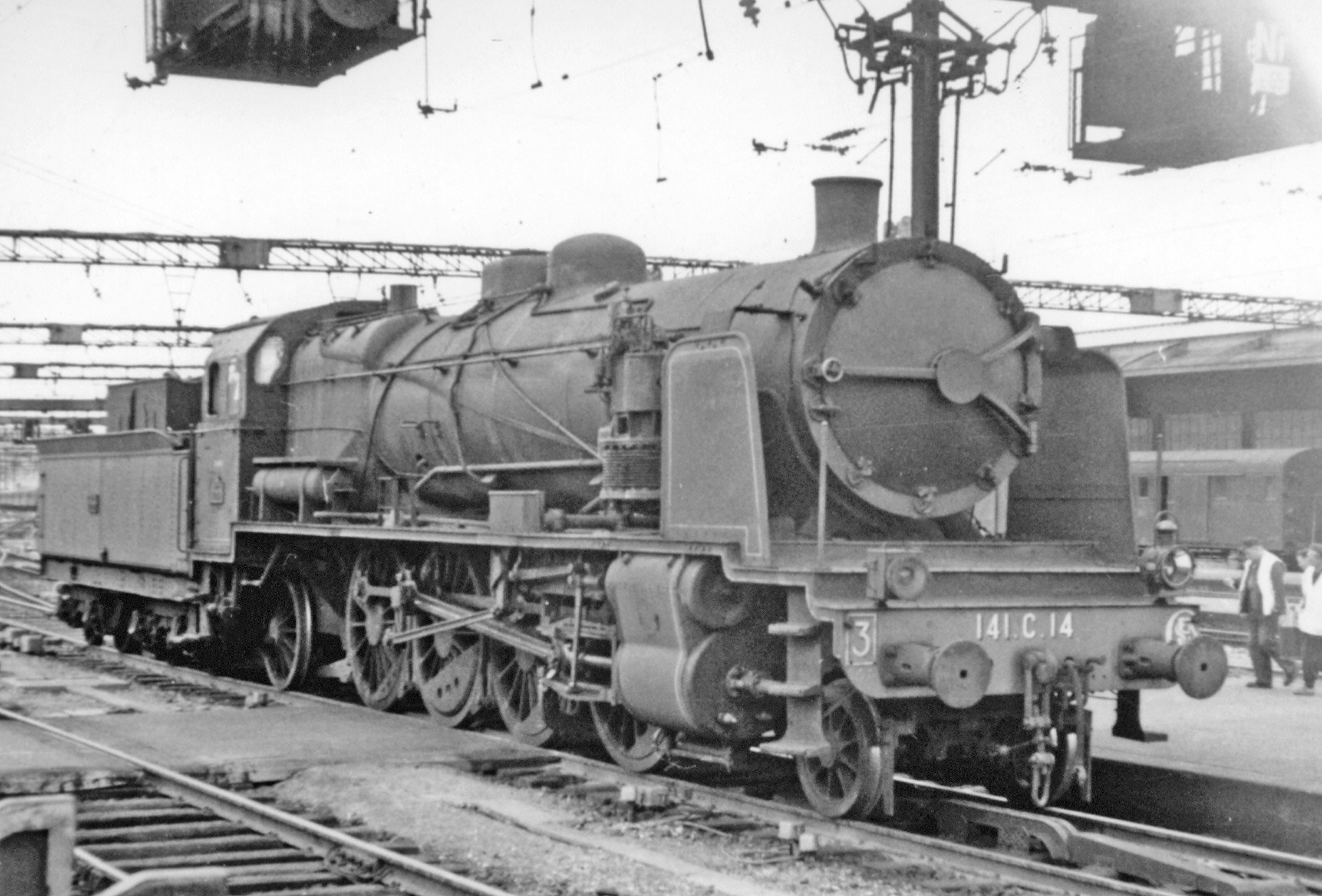
in France 1956
