= État 3701 to 3755 =

État 3701–3755 SNCF 3-230.B
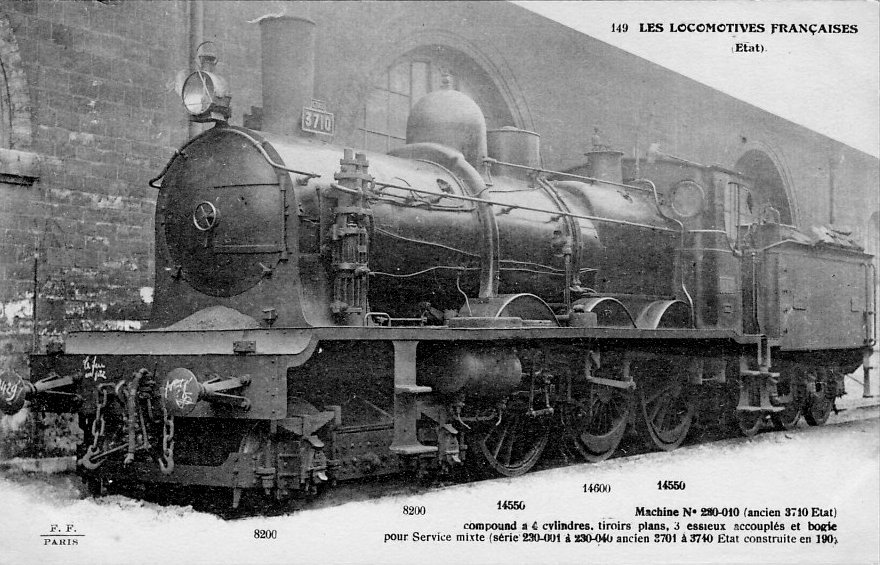
Type and origin
- Power type: Steam
- Builder: Fives-Lille; SFCM; Schneider et Cie.
- Build date: 1901–1909
- Total produced: 55
Specifications
- Configuration
  - Whyte: 4-6-0
  - UIC: 2′C n4v
- Gauge: 1,435 mm (4 ft 8 1/2 in)
- Driver dia.: 1,750 mm (68.90 in)
- Length: 16.135 m (52 ft 11.24 in)
- Axle load: 14.6 tonnes (14.4 long tons; 16.1 short tons)
- Adhesive weight: 43.7 tonnes (43.0 long tons; 48.2 short tons)
- Loco weight: 60.1 tonnes (59.2 long tons; 66.2 short tons)
- Tender weight: 38.1 tonnes (37.5 long tons; 42.0 short tons)
- Tender type: 3-axle
- Fuel type: Coal
- Fuel capacity: 6 tonnes (5.9 long tons; 6.6 short tons)
- Water cap.: 15,200 litres (3,300 imp gal; 4,000 US gal)
- Firebox
  - Grate area: 2.42 m^{2} (26.0 sq ft)
- Boiler pressure: 15.0 kg/cm^{2} (1.47 MPa; 213 lbf/in^{2})
- Heating surface: 187.97 m^{2} (2,023.3 sq ft)
- Cylinders: Four, compound: HP outside, LP inside
- High-pressure cylinder: 350 mm × 640 mm (13.78 in × 25.20 in)
- Low-pressure cylinder: 550 mm × 640 mm (21.65 in × 25.20 in)
Performance figures
- Maximum speed: 100 km/h (62 mph)
- Power output: 1,010 hp (1,020 PS; 750 kW)
Career
- Operators: Chemins de fer de l'État; SNCF
- Numbers: État 3701 – 3755; État 230-001 to 230-055; SNCF 3-230.B.1 to 3-230.B55

État 3701 to 3755 were a series of 4-6-0 de Glenn compound steam locomotives of the Chemins de fer de l'État built between 1901 and 1909.

Nene Valley Railway By SNCF Nord Locomotives.

== Description ==
The class were four-cylinder compound locomotives of the de Glehn type – the high-pressure cylinders were on the outside and drove the middle coupled wheels, the low-pressure cylinders were inside, and drove the leading coupled wheels.

They were mixed traffic locomotives, for use on express and local passenger trains as well as freight trains on all parts of the État network. The design was inspired by, and similar to Midi 1301 to 1370, Nord 3.078 to 3.354, and PO 1721 to 1735.

They were equipped with 3-axle tenders that held 6 tonnes (5.9 long tons; 6.6 short tons) of coal and 15,200 litres (3,300 imp gal; 4,000 US gal) of water, and were numbered 15.251 to 15.305.

Table of locomotive
1st État No.	1910 État No.	Manufacturer	Serial No.	Year	Notes
3701–3710	230-001 – 230-010	Fives-Lille	3167–3176	1901	
3711–3730	230-011 – 230-030	SFCM	2559–2578	1902	
3731–3740	230-031 – 230-040	Fives-Lille	3339–3348	1906	
3741–3755	230-041 – 230-055	Schneider & Co.	3041–3055	1909	

The first 30 had Wegner brakes, the remainder had Westinghouse brakes.

They were capable of pulling hauling passenger trains of 225 to 250 tonnes (221 to 246 long tons; 248 to 276 short tons) at 90 kilometres per hour (56 mph), passenger trains of 350 to 400 tonnes (340 to 390 long tons; 390 to 440 short tons) at 70 kilometres per hour (43 mph), and freight trains 700 tonnes (690 long tons; 770 short tons) at speeds of 40 to 50 kilometres per hour (25 to 31 mph). On inclines of 1% (1 in 100), they could pull 160 tonnes (160 long tons; 180 short tons) at 95 kilometres per hour (59 mph).

== Use ==
They were used thought the État network, and proved to be more economical than the 4-4-0 and 2-4-2 locomotive that they displaced. They were allocated to the locomotive depots of Nantes Sainte-Anne, La Roche-sur-Yon, La Rochelle, Saintes, Saint-Mariens, Cholet, Thouars, and Bressuire.

After 1938, the newly created SNCF renumbered the locomotives 3-230.B.1 to 3-230.B.55; while the tenders were renumbered 15.B.251 to 15.B.305. Forty-six survived World War II, the last was withdrawn in 1960, having been used on Saint-Mariens to Bordeaux local services.

None have been preserved, but the Cité du train in Mulhouse has one of the similar Midi, locomotives, No. 1314.
