= État 140-101 to 140-370 =

Class of steam locomotives

État 140–101 to 140-370 SNCF 140.CK
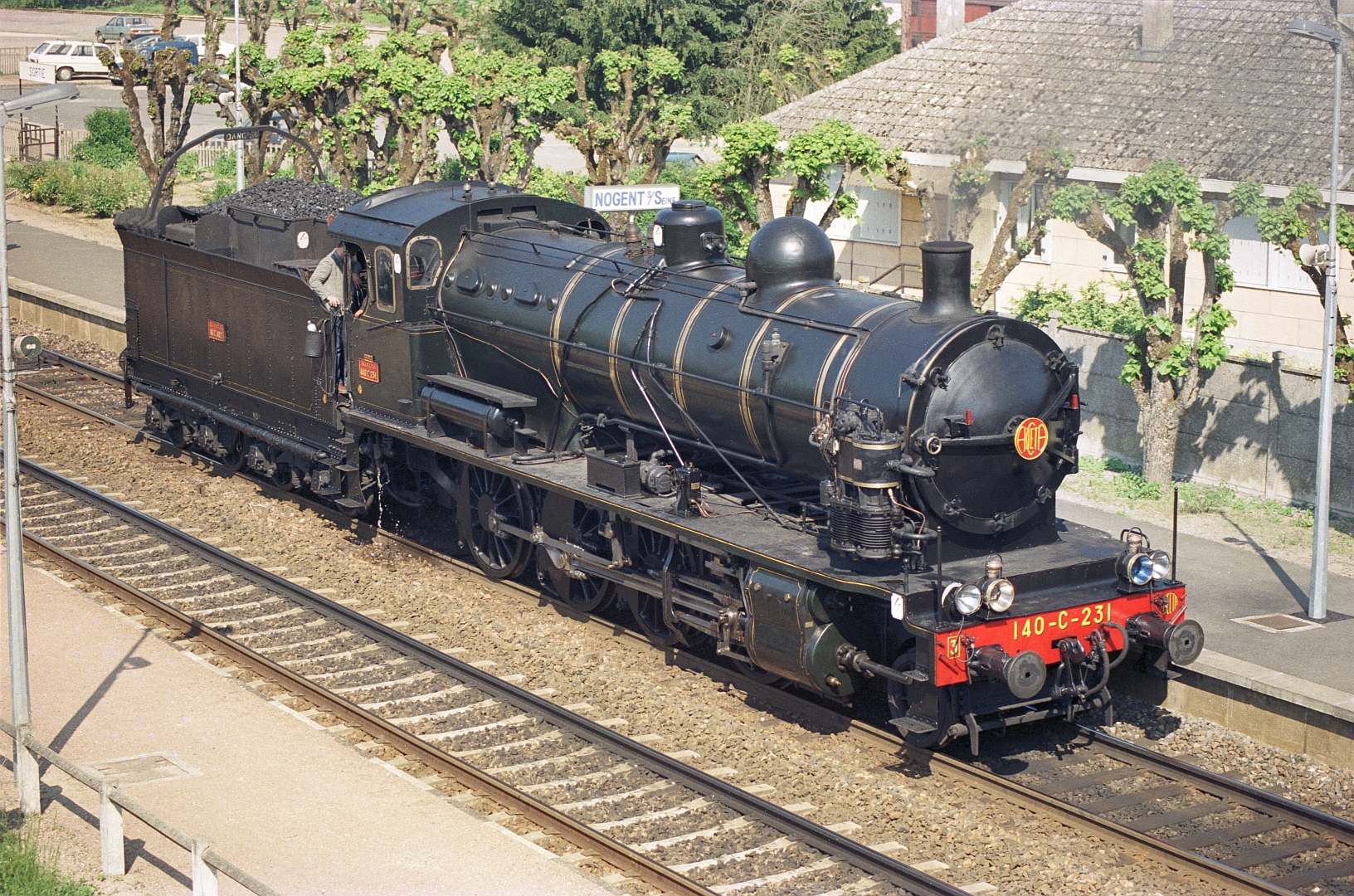
- 140.C.231 at Nogent-sur-Seine station, 24 May 1987
Type and origin
- Power type: Steam
- Builder: SACM (20); Schneider et Cie. (25); Fives-Lille (25); Nasmyth, Wilson & Company (20); North British Locomotive Company (215); Vulcan Foundry (35)
- Build date: 1913–1920
Specifications
- Configuration
  - Whyte: 2-8-0
  - UIC: 1′D h2
- Gauge: 1,435 mm (4 ft 8 1/2 in)
- Leading dia.: 0.860 m (2 ft 9.9 in)
- Driver dia.: 1.440 m (4 ft 8.7 in)
- Length: 11.75 m (38 ft 7 in)
- Adhesive weight: 64.5–67.9 tonnes (63.5–66.8 long tons; 71.1–74.8 short tons)
- Loco weight: 73.2–77.4 tonnes (72.0–76.2 long tons; 80.7–85.3 short tons)
- Tender weight: 45–49.5 tonnes (44.3–48.7 long tons; 49.6–54.6 short tons)
- Fuel type: Coal
- Fuel capacity: 5 tonnes (4.9 long tons; 5.5 short tons)
- Water cap.: 18,000 litres (4,000 imp gal; 4,800 US gal)
- Firebox
  - Grate area: 3.16 m^{2} (34.0 sq ft)
- Boiler pressure: 1.2–1.4 MPa (170–200 lbf/in^{2})
- Heating surface: 172.46 m^{2} (1,856.3 sq ft)
- Superheater
  - Type: Schmidt or Robinson
  - Heating area: 49.0 m^{2} (527 sq ft)
- Cylinders: Two, outside
- Cylinder size: 590 mm × 640 mm (23.23 in × 25.20 in)
Performance figures
- Power output: 900 kW (1,210 hp)
- Tractive effort: 157.8–184.1 kN (35,470–41,390 lbf)
Career
- Operators: Chemins de fer de l'État → SNCF
- Class: SNCF: 3-140.C
- Number in class: 340
- Numbers: 140-001 to 070 and 140–101 to 370
- Disposition: 8 preserved, remainder scrapped

État 140–101 to 140-370 is a class of 2-8-0 steam locomotive of the Chemins de fer de l'État, and subsequently the SNCF.

== Design ==
The engines had an output of 900 kW (1,210 hp) and capable of a speed of up 70 km/h (43 mph). Their light weight per axle made them capable of hauling both passenger and goods trains on most of the État's network.

The engines' performances were honorable, and could haul 1000 ton trains at 50 km/h (31 mph) on the level, 550 ton trains at the same speed on gradients of 10‰ (1 in 100) and 260 ton trains on gradients of 20‰ (1 in 50).

== Construction ==
The 340 locomotives were ordered in three series. The first series, 70 locomotives, numbered 140–101 to 140–170 were built in France by Schneider et Cie. at Le Creusot, SACM at Belfort, and Fives-Lille. These were built and were put into service in 1913.

The declaration of war in 1914 forced the Chemins de fer de l'État to entrust the construction of the second series of 200 locomotives to Nasmyth, Wilson & Company of Manchester and North British Locomotive Company of Glasgow. Two hundred engines, numbered 140–171 to 140-370, were delivered in 1916 and 1917. Six engines (140-337, 338, 339, 340, 368 and 369) were lost at sea on 30 April 1918, when the cargo ship transporting them, the SS Saint Chamond was torpedoed off the north Cornish coast, 14 nautical miles north of St Ives Head. These engines were mostly used for hauling freight trains.

Table of État orders
Year	Manufacturer	Serial nos.	État nos.	SNCF nos.	Notes
1913	SACM (Belfort)	6560–6579	140-101 – 140-120	3-140.C.101 – 120	
1913	Schneider et Cie.	3262–3286	140-121 – 140-145	3-140.C.121 – 145	
1913	Fives-Lille	3970–3994	140-146 – 140-170	3-140.C.146 – 170	
1916	North British Loco. Co.	21316–21395	140-171 – 140-250	3-140.C.171 – 250	
1916–1917	Nasmyth, Wilson & Co.	1120–1139	140.251 – 140.270	3-140.C.251 – 270	
1917	North British Loco. Co.	21608–21657	140.271 – 140.320	3-140.C.271 – 320	NBL Order No. L-681
1917	North British Loco. Co.	21558–21607	140.321 – 140.370	1-140.C.321 – 370	NBL Order No. L-680

The third series of 70 locomotives was ordered by the French rail-mounted heavy artillery (Artillerie Lourde sur Voie Ferrée, ALVF). They were numbered 1 to 70, and half were built by North British Locomotive in 1916, and the other half by Vulcan Foundry between 1919 and 1920. After the war, these 70 locomotives were sold, with the NBL-built locomotives going to the Chemins de fer de l'Est as Est 40.001 to 40.035, and the VF-built locomotives to the Chemins de fer de Paris à Lyon et à la Méditerranée (PLM) as 140.K.1 to 140.K.35.

Table of ALVF orders
Year	Manufacturer	Serial nos.	ALVF nos.	Est/PLM nos.	SNCF nos.	Notes
1916	North British Locomotive Co.	21523–21557	1–35	Est 40.001 – 40.035	1-140.C.1 – 35	
1919–1920	Vulcan Foundry	3235–3269	36–70	140.K.1 – 35	PLM 5–140.K.1 – 35	

On the formation of the SNCF in 1938, the Est locomotives became 1–140.C.to 1–140.C.35; the État locomotives became 3–140.C.101 to 3–140.C.370; and the PLM locomotives 5–140.K.1 to 5–140.K.35. After World War II, the locomotives were concentrated in the Eastern Region, and while the ex-État locomotives only needed their region prefix changed from "3" to "1", the ex-PLM locomotives were renumbered to 1–140.C.36 to 1–140.C.70.

== Service ==
The 140.Cs were allocated to all the main État depots, Mézidon, Le Mans, Rennes, Brest, Nantes and Bordeaux, and were used to haul many of the company's express trains; Paris–Le Havre, Paris–Cherbourg, Paris–Granville and on the Grande Ceinture line.

The 140.Cs, hired out to CFTA, were the last steam locomotives in regular day-to-day commercial use on the French railway network. Their final area of operation was the CFTA Réseau Franche-Comté, whose HQ was at Gray, Haute-Saône. Operations were mainly centred on the line from Gray to Châtillon-sur-Seine and Troyes (in Champagne). After the end of SNCF operated steam in 1974, the 140 Cs became the last operating 'main line' French steam locomotives. 140 C 287 pulled the last ever commercial steam train on French railway metals on 24 September 1975 between Gray and Sainte-Colombe.

== Preservation ==
Four locomotives, 140.C.230, 140.C.231, 140.C.313 and 140.C.314 were, thanks to their general good condition, chosen by the CFTA to form a reserve pool of engines. They received servicing at Le Mans in 1970 and were taken to Chaumont engine shed in February 1971. None of the engines were ever reused and 140.C.230 was the only locomotive of the group of four to be scrapped. 140.C.231 was then taken from Chaumont to Longueville on 22 October 1972. 140.C.231, along with tender 18.C.482 is owned by the AJECTA and is chartered on French railways

Due to their prolonged use on parts of SNCF and on the CFTA, a total of eight engines are preserved :—

- 140.C.22 (NBL 21544 of 1916)
- 140.C.27 (NBL 21549 of 1916)
- 140.C.38 (VF 3237 of 1919) is at Train à vapeur en Limousin
- 140.C.231 (NBL 21376 of 1916) and tender 18.C.482 are owned by AJECTA, and listed as a Monument historique.
- 140.C.287 (NBL 21624 of 1917)
- 140.C.313 (NBL 21650 of 1917) is plinthed at Reims station
- 140.C.314 (NBL 21651 of 1917) owned by the Chemin de fer touristique du Vermandois (CFVT) and is used on its line.
- 140.C.344 (NBL 21581 of 1917) is part of Cité du Train, Mulhouse

Only one Vulcan-built 140.C was saved (all Nasmyth, Wilson & Co. engines were scrapped) and none of the prewar engines (built in France) survived into preservation.
