= État 40-001 to 40-143 =

Class of steam locomotives

État 40-001 to 40-143 SNCF 3-040.TA
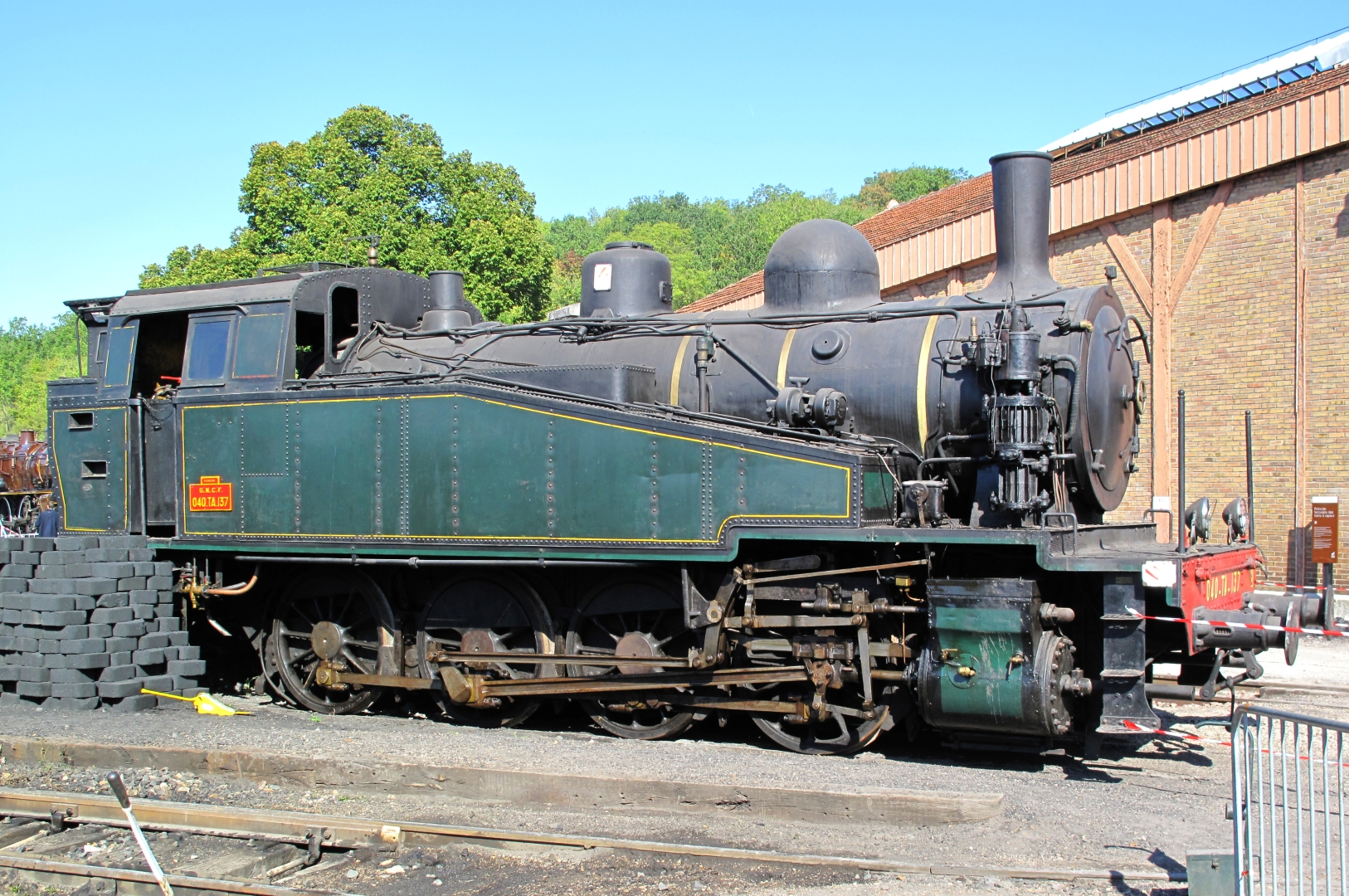
- 3-040.TA.137 (État 40-137) at Longueville, 19 September 2010.
Type and origin
- Power type: Steam
- Builder: ANF (47); Schneider et Cie. (50); Cie. Five-Lille (40); Sotteville (6)
- Build date: 1914, 1920–1922
- Total produced: 143
Specifications
- Configuration
  - Whyte: 0-8-0T
  - UIC: D n2t
- Gauge: 1,435 mm (4 ft 8 1/2 in)
- Driver dia.: 1,300 mm (51.18 in)
- Loco weight: 62.8–63.7 tonnes (61.8–62.7 long tons; 69.2–70.2 short tons)
- Fuel type: Coal
- Fuel capacity: 3 tonnes (3.0 long tons; 3.3 short tons)
- Water cap.: 7,000 litres (1,500 imp gal; 1,800 US gal)
- Firebox
  - Grate area: 1.80 m^{2} (19.4 sq ft)
- Boiler pressure: 12 kg/cm^{2} (1.18 MPa; 171 psi)
- Heating surface: 110.0 m^{2} (1,184 sq ft)
- Cylinders: Two, outside
- Cylinder size: 480 mm × 600 mm (18.90 in × 23.62 in)
- Valve gear: Walschaerts
Career
- Operators: Chemins de Fer de l'État → SNCF
- Class: SNCF: 3-040.TA
- Numbers: État: 40-001 to 40-143; SNCF: 3-040.TA.1 to 040.TA.143
- Preserved: Two: 040.TA.137 and 040.TA.141

État 40-001 to 40-143 was a class of 0-8-0 Tank locomotives of the Chemins de Fer de l'État. They later served with the SNCF who renumbered them 3–040.TA.1 to 3–040.TA.143.

== Design ==
The 40-000s were of simple expansion with two cylinders and possessed a Crampton firebox and Walschaerts valve gear. The connecting rod was attached to the third axle; white the boiler had the steam dome on the first ring, and a sandbox on the second ring. The water tanks on each side of the firebox possessed a sloping front and gave the driver additional vision and permitted him to see if workmen were on the track in front of the engine. There were variants in cabs and several open cabs, others, closed.

These were designed to replace the 030 0-6-0 shunting engines. The 0-6-0 engines possessed a traction force of 40 tons, while the 0-8-0 were designed to have a traction force of 60 tons. It was in 1913 that the research department of the Chemins de Fer de l'État began to study the question of a replacement.

== Construction ==
The series of 143 engines were built between 1914 and 1922, with a break during World War I. The first 18 engines, numbered 40-001 to 40-018, were put into service in 1914. The war prevented the construction of the rest of the series, and the last two engines of the first batch, 40-019 and 40-020, were taken by the German Army and not returned until 1919 and 1922 respectively. Construction resumed in 1920 and the full series of 143 engines was put into service by 1922. Most were built by French engineering companies, but six were built in the État's former Ouest workshops at Sotteville, Rouen. Locomotives of the same design were built for French industry.

Table of orders
Year	Manufacturer	Serial nos.	État nos.	SNCF nos.	Notes
1914	ANF	76–95	40-001 – 40-020	3–040.TA.1 – 19, 140	-020 renumbered -140 on its return from Germany
1922	ANF	96–105	40-021 – 42-030	3–040.TA.21 – 30	
1920	Schneider	3380–3429	40-031 – 40-080	3–040.TA.31 – 80	Serial nos not in order
1921	Fives-Lille	4253–4292	40-081 – 40-120	3–040.TA.81 – 120	
1920	Sotteville	61–63	40-121 – 40-123	3–040.TA.121 – 123	
1922	ANF	121–137	40-124 – 40–139; 40-020 (2nd)	3–040.TA.124 – 139, 20	
1922	Sotteville	64–66	40-141 – 40-143	3–040.TA.141 – 143	

== Service ==
The engines were assigned to the depots of Paris-Vaugirard, Montrouge, Batignoles, Sotteville (Rouen), Le Havre, Dieppe, Trappes, Chartres, Caen, Cherbourg, St-Brieuc, Brest, Nantes, Rennes and La Rochelle as well as industrial railways and harbours. When the SNCF was formed, the series was renumbered 3–040.TA.1 to 3–040.TA.143.

During World War II, 52 locomotives were taken to Germany, where many of them were given enclosed cabs; 25 of these locomotives never returned and were written off. During the 1950s and 60s, twelve locomotives were sold to industry.

== Preservation ==
There are two examples of this class which have survived into preservation. They are:—

- 40-137 (ANF 143 of 1922), later SNCF 3–040.TA.137, was one of the locomotives taken to Germany. It is now at the Musée vivant du chemin de fer in Longueville, Seine-et-Marne, and designated a Monument historique.
- 40-141 (Sotteville 64 of 1922), later SNCF 3–040.TA.141.

040TA class shunting at St.Malo July 1965
