= Longueville, Seine-et-Marne =

Longueville
- Commune
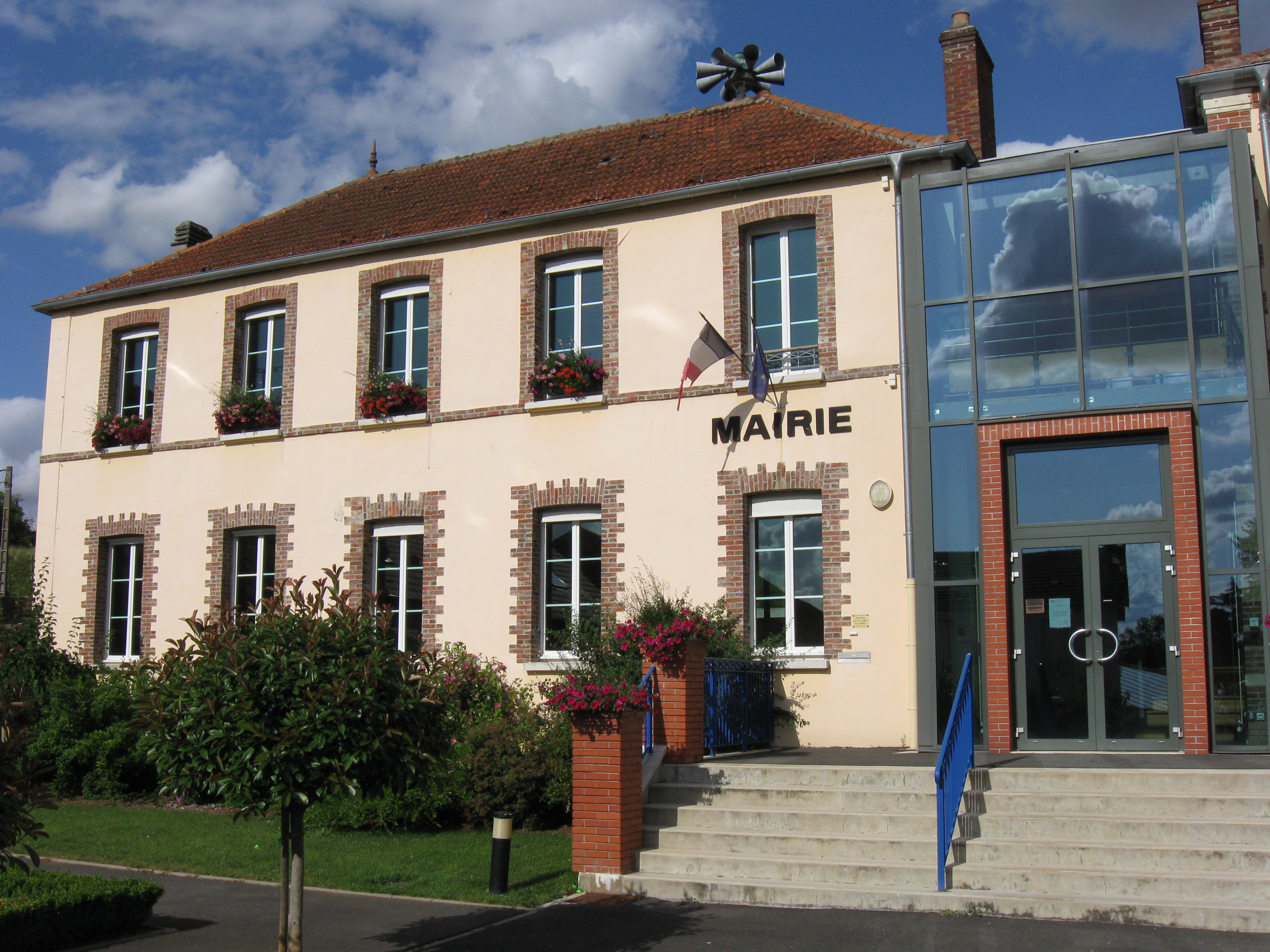
- The town hall in Longueville
- Location of Longueville
- Location within France Location within Île-de-France (region)
- Coordinates: 48°31′00″N 3°15′00″E
- Country: France
- Region: Île-de-France
- Department: Seine-et-Marne
- Arrondissement: Provins
- Canton: Provins
- Intercommunality: CC Provinois

Government
  - Mayor (2020–2026): Philippe Fortin
- Area^{1}: 5.61 km^{2} (2.17 sq mi)
- Highest elevation: 145 m (476 ft)
- Lowest elevation: 66 m (217 ft)
- Population (2023): 1,804
  - Density: 322/km^{2} (833/sq mi)
- Time zone: UTC+01:00 (CET)
  - Summer (DST): UTC+02:00 (CEST)
- INSEE/Postal code: 77260 /77650
- ^{1} French Land Register data, which excludes lakes, ponds, glaciers > 1 km^{2} (0.386 sq mi or 247 acres) and river estuaries.

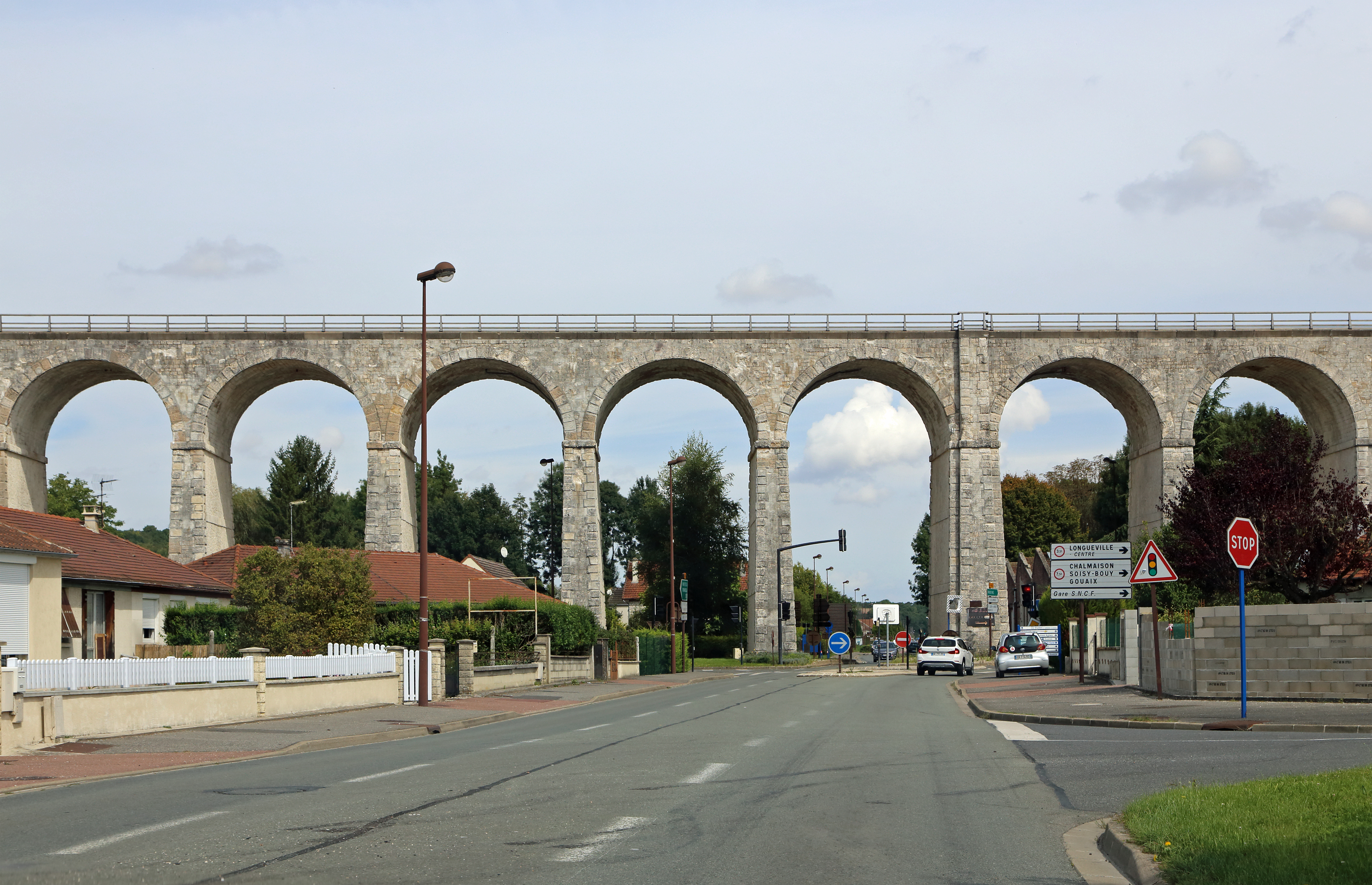
The railway bridge of Longueville

Longueville (French pronunciation: [lɔ̃ɡvil]) is a commune in the Seine-et-Marne department in the Île-de-France region in north-central France. Longueville station has rail connections to Provins, Chaumont, Troyes, Mulhouse, Dijon and Paris.

== Demographics ==
The inhabitants are called the Longuevillois.

== See also ==
- Communes of the Seine-et-Marne department
