= Fives-Lille =

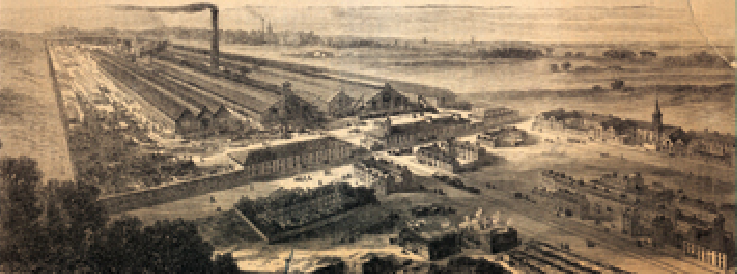
The Fives-Lille factory, circa 1865

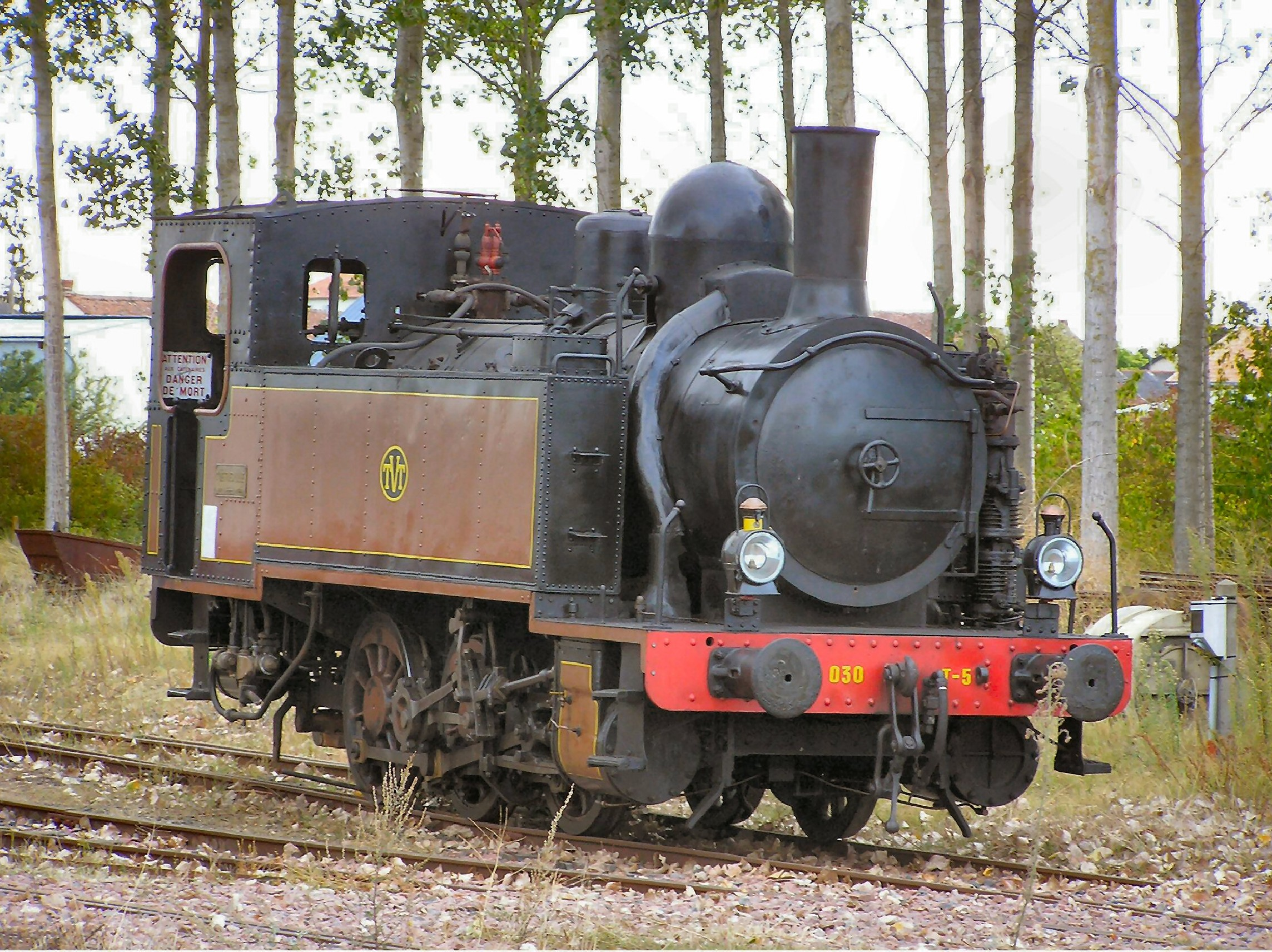
Fives-Lille locomotive no. 3716, preserved

Fives-Lille was a French engineering company located at Fives, a suburb of Lille. It is now part of the Fives Group.

== History ==
The company began as Parent, Schaken, Caillet et Cie in 1861. The founders Basile Parent and Pierre Schaken were of Belgian origin.

The company later entered into a joint venture with Société J. F. Cail & Cie. This co-operation led to expansion and the creation of several factories. One plant, located in the district of Fives, near Lille, specialized in the construction of rails and steam locomotives. Another plant in Givors on the Rhône specialized in wheelsets for railway rolling stock.

The business developed and became, in 1865, the Compagnie de Fives - Lille, then in 1868, the limited company Compagnie de Fives-Lille pour constructions mécaniques et entreprises. It appears that the Cail company kept its separate identity and did not merge with Fives-Lille until 1958. IK Partners acquired Fives-Lille through a public offering on the Paris Stock Exchange in February 2001, before the Group was successfully sold to Barclays Private Equity in August 2004. Later, it changed its name to "Fives-Lille-Cail" and then to "Fives-Cail-Babcock" and finally to "Fives", in 2007.

== Preservation ==
- Fives-Lille locomotive no. 3716 is preserved at Train des mouettes

== Sources ==
- M, A (1877), "Visite aux Ateliers de la Compagnie de Fives-Lille, a Fives-Lille", Bulletin de la Société de l'Industrie Minérale, vol. VI, La Société de l'Industrie Minérale, pp. 352–367
