= Société Alsacienne de Constructions Mécaniques =

Defunct French manufacturing company

The Société Alsacienne de Constructions Mécaniques (the Alsatian Corporation of Mechanical Engineering), or SACM, is an engineering company with its headquarters in Mulhouse, Alsace, which produced railway locomotives, textile and printing machinery, diesel engines, boilers, lifting equipment, firearms and mining equipment. SACM also produced the first atomic reactor at Marcoule.

== History ==
=== Foundation ===
The company was founded by André Koechlin in 1826 to produce textile machinery. In 1839, he opened a factory to build railway locomotives at Mulhouse in Alsace. The business grew rapidly but in 1871, the annexation of Alsace-Lorraine by Germany, brought about the transfer of some production to Belfort in France. In 1872 the company merged with the Graffenstaden company of Illkirch-Graffenstaden (a suburb of Strasbourg) to form SACM.

=== Alsthom ===
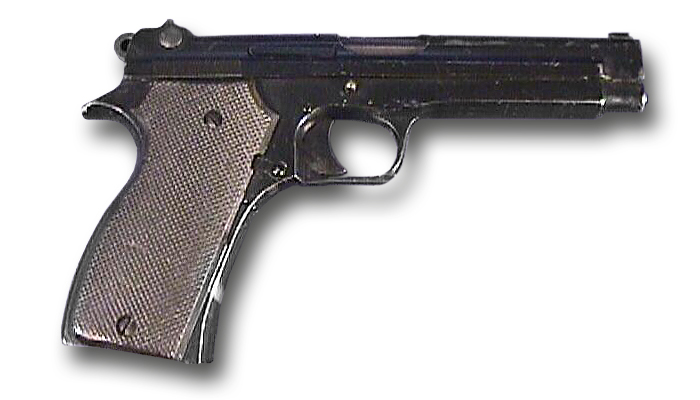
The Modèle 1935 pistol manufactured by SACM for the French Army and German occupying forces 1937-1950.

The new company diversified into the production of boilers, steel equipment, printing equipment, compressors, firearms and other engineering products growing to 4500 employees by 1910. A new foundry was built in 1922 for textile machinery. In 1928 the Compagnie Française Thomson-Houston merged with the Electrical Engineering division of SACM to form a new company named Alsthom, (Alsace-Thomson), later changed to Alstom.

=== Alcatel ===
In 1940, Alsace and Lorraine were again annexed/occupied to the German Reich, the production of locomotives for Germany began. After the war, the remaining divisions of SACM continued operating independently until 1966 when the company became a subsidiary of the Company's Hispano-Alsatian machine-building (SHACM) and Alsatian Society of Industrial Investments (ALSPI). In 1970 a new company Alcatel was created by merging The Industrial Telephone Company (a subsidiary of the General Electricity Company), with the Nuclear energy telecommunications and electronic Department of SACM.

=== Wärtsilä SACM Diesel ===
In 1982, the remaining parts of SACM separated the textile machinery division which closed in August 1986, and became SACM DIESEL in 1989. In 1993, the company changed its name to Wärtsilä SACM Diesel with the Finnish group Wärtsilä Diesel taking full control of the company Mulhouse.

=== Site changes ===
The historical Alsatian diesel engine plant closed in late 1999 and has been rehabilitated as an extension of the University of Haute Alsace. The conservation of the SACM foundry received a Europa Nostra award for outstanding heritage achievements on industrial and engineering structures and sites in 2010. A new plant devoted to diesel and gas engines has opened in Lyon SACM Power and does the manufacturing and refurbishing of diesel and gas engines and mini-power plants.

== Steam locomotives ==
Production of steam locomotives was originally carried out at Mulhouse and Graffenstaden (for German production), and Belfort for the French production. Both plants also exported models. However, after the First World War, Mulhouse and Graffenstaden built French steam locomotives, and Belfort specialized in the construction of electric locomotives.

During the 1890s the company was particularly noted for its fast and efficient compound locomotives designed by Alfred de Glehn.

== Diesel engines ==
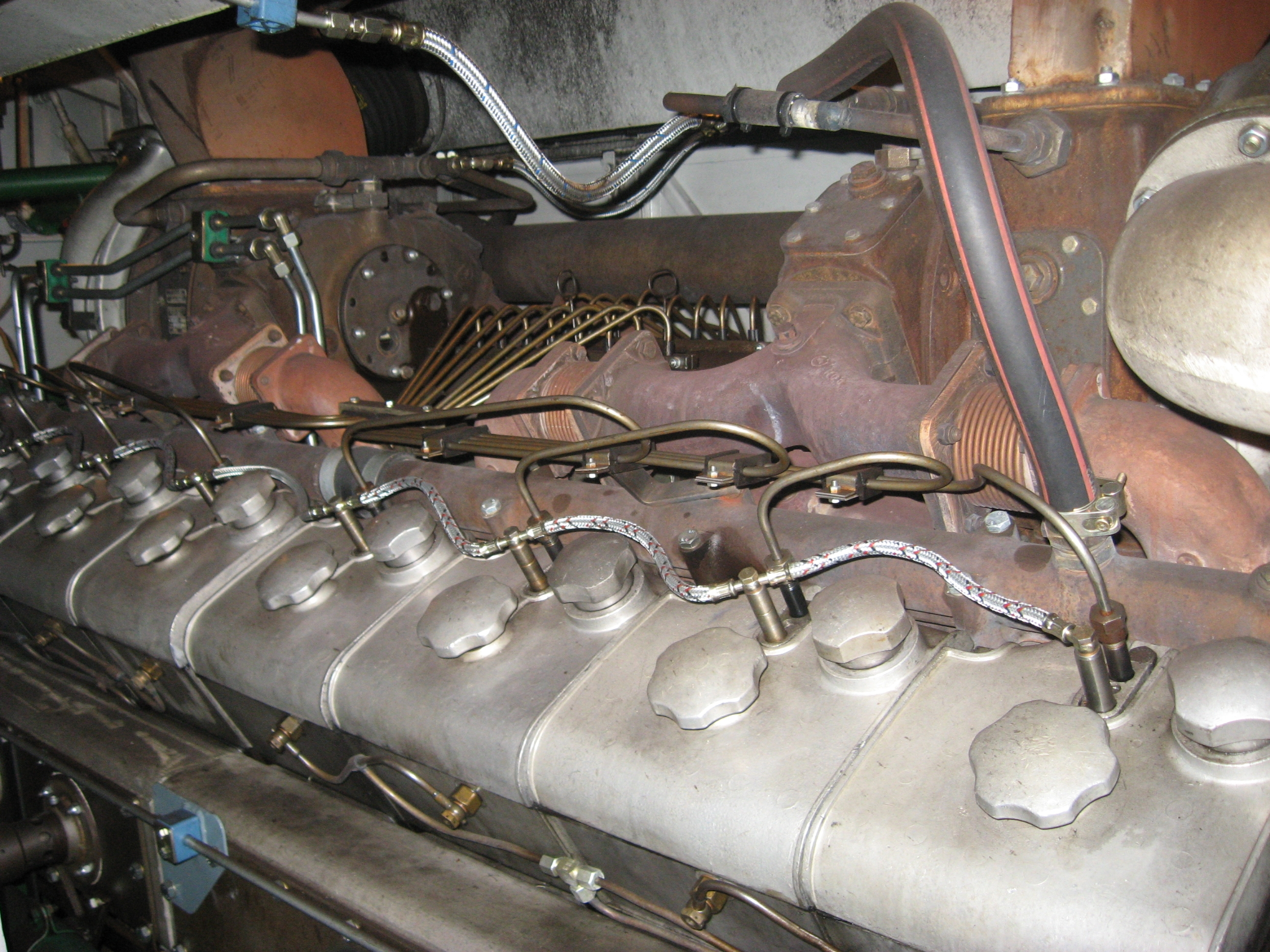
MGO V16 BSHR-diesel engine with displacement of 72 litres and power of 1000 kW on Finnish Dv12-class locomotive

Diesel engines built at Mulhouse have been sold worldwide primarily for ship propulsion, locomotives and railcars, and as power generators. The range of diesel engines produced by SACM included:

- MGO (MAREP Grosshans Ollier) 175 mm bore, 6 to 16 cylinders
- AGO (Alsacienne Grosshans Ollier) 195 mm bore, 12 to 16 cylinders
- AGO (Alsacienne Grosshans Ollier) 240 mm bore, 12 to 20 cylinders

MAREP Moteur MGO was the Société de Matériel et de Recherche Pétrolière. Grosshans Ollier refers to Georges Frédéric Grosshans and Jacques Gaspard Ollier who held a patent for liquid-cooled pistons, US patent 3,323,503 of 6 June 1967. Examples of SNCF locomotives using these engines were BB 63400 (MGO engine) and CC 72000 (AGO engine).

== See also ==
- List of SNCF classes

== Bibliography ==
- Michèle Merger, Les entreprises et leurs réseaux, Presses Paris Sorbonne, 1998 (ISBN 9782840501220)
- Marie-Claire Vitoux, SACM, Quelle belle histoire! : De la Fonderie à l'Université, Mulhouse, 1826–2007, La Nuée bleue, 2007 (ISBN 9782716507233)
