= List of Chemins de Fer du Nord locomotives =

The Chemins de Fer du Nord was one of the five main constituents of the SNCF at its creation in 1938.

== Jules Petiet (1848–1871) ==
Jules Petiet was made the Chief of Works in 1845, and Locomotive Engineer in 1848, a post he held until his death in January 1871.

Nord No. (1845 series)	Nord No. 1872 series	SNCF No.	Type	Manufacturer Serial numbers	Year made	Quantity made	Year(s) withdrawn	Comments
201–264	3.201 – 3.264	—	C n2	Société Expansion (29); Société Ch.Derosne et Cail (24); Ernest Goüin et Cie. (10)	1846–47	64	by 1899	Stephenson long-boiler type.
501–502	3.801 – 3.802	—	C n2t	André Koechlin	1847	33	1877–1909	Shunting locomotives.
265–274	3.265 – 3.274	—	C n2	Schneider et Cie.	1849	10	by 1913	Mammouth-type.
275–296; 301–338	3.275–3.296; 3.301 – 3.334; 3.297 – 3.300	—	C n2	Schneider et Cie	1852–55	60	by 1919	Built or soon fitted with 'friction roller' (galet) on additional axle.
503–535	3.803 – 3.835	—	C n2t	Ernest Goüin et Cie. (18); André Koechlin (15)	1854–62	33	1877–1909	Station shunting locomotives.
401–436	2.401 – 2.436	—	B3 n2t	Maschinenfabrik Esslingen (6); Charbonniers et Cie. (20); Nord (La Chapelle) (10)	1855–57	36	by 1907	Engerth locomotives. 12 rebuilt as 0-4-2 tender locomotives between 1873 and 1878.
370–399	4.400, 4.371–4.399	—	D2 n2t	Schneider et Cie.	1855	30	by 1910	Engerth locomotives.
360–369	4.370, 4.361–4.369	—	D2 n2t	Graffenstaden	1857	10	by 1907	Engerth locomotives.
551–600	4.551 – 4.600	—	D n2t	Ernest Goüin et Cie. (35); Schneider et Cie. (15)	1858–65	50	1909–?	“Fortes Rampes”; renumbered 4.1749 to 4.1770 in 1921.
340–359	3.640, 3.621 – 3.629	—	C n2	Graffenstaden	1860	20	?	Four rebuilt as tank locomotives in 1880.
541–550	3.641 – 3.650	—	C n2	Graffenstaden	1861	47	by 1907	
437–444	—	—	A3A n4t	Ernest Goüin et Cie.	1862	8		“Camels”; sold to Nord-Belge.
651–697	3.651 – 3.697	—	C n2	Graffenstaden (12); Schneider et Cie. (35)	1862–67	47	by 1907	
601–620	(3.601 – 3.620)	—	CC n4t	Ernest Goüin et Cie.	1863	20	1872	rebuilt into 40 0-6-0T locomotives in 1872; 4 then sold to Nord-Belge in 1873
801–805	4.601 – 4.605	—	D n2t	Schneider et Cie.	1865	5		Renumbered 4.1771 to 4.1774 in 1921.
491–500	3.921 – 3.930	—	C n2t	André Koechlin	1866	10	1914–30	Shunting locomotives.
633–650	3.335 – 3.352	—	C n2	André Koechlin	1866	18	1911–25	Renumbered 3.1335 to 3.1352 in 1911.
811–899	4.811 – 4.899	—	D n2	Société J. F. Cail & Cie. (24); Schneider et Cie. (65)	1866–72	89		“180 Unites”; many rebuilt as tank locomotives (1907–16); all renumbered in 1921.
445–450	2.481 – 2.486	—	B1 n2	Société J. F. Cail & Cie.	1867	6	1909–23	
451–480	2.451 – 2.480	—	B1 n2	Société J. F. Cail & Cie.	1867	30	1909–23	
901–920	3.901 – 3.920	—	C n2t	André Koechlin	1867	20	1923–39	
921–950	2.487 – 2.516	—	B1 n2	Société J. F. Cail & Cie.	1870	30	1909–23	
951–970	2.951 – 2.970	—	1B n2t	Fives-Lille (10); Schneider et Cie. (10)	1867–68	20	1905–30	Ouest-type suburban tank locomotives
621–632	2.821 – 2.832	—	1B n2	André Koechlin	1870	12	1922–30	Based on Great Northern Railway (Great Britain) 264 class; Rebuilt as ‘Reinforced Outrance’ 4-4-0s (1890–92)

== Édouard Delebecque (1871–1888) ==
Édouard Delebecque renumbered the locomotive stock in 1872 with a scheme that lasted until the Nord was nationalised in 1938. He also discontinued the naming of locomotives from 1873.

Nord No.	SNCF No.	Type	Manufacturer Serial numbers	Year made	Quantity made	Year(s) withdrawn	Comments
3.931 – 3.996	030.TA.1 – 65	C t	Nord (La Chapelle); SACM (Graffenstaden) (20)	(1872)	66		36 Rebuilt from Petiet's 0-6-6-0T locomotives; 30 new
2.001 – 2.035	020.TA.1 – ?	B t	Fives-Lille (6); Franco-Belge (12); Nord (La Chapelle) (17)	1878–1889	35		“Ink Bottles”
3.401 to 3.512	—	C n2	SACM (72); Nord (La Chapelle) (15); Nord (Hellemmes) (5); Schneider et Cie. (20)	1883–91	112	1925–35	"Outrance Goods".
2.201 to 2.212	—	1B n2	SACM	1884–84	12	1922–31	"Outrance"; rebuilt 1891–92 as 2′B n2.
701	—	1AA n4v	SACM	1885	1	1928	Rebuilt as 2′AA n4v
3.101	—	1′C n3v	Nord (La Chapelle)	1887	1	1929	“La Baleine”. Renumbered 3.395 in 1909
2.101	—	2′B n2	Nord (La Chapelle)	1888	1	1893	Exhibited at Exposition Universelle (1889).

== Gaston du Bousquet (1890–1910) ==
Nord No.	SNCF No.	Type	Manufacturer Serial numbers	Year made	Quantity made	Year(s) withdrawn	Comments
2.121 – 2.180	220.A.1 – 4	2′B n4v	SACM	1891–1898	60	1933–	“Chocolats”
2.311 – 2.380	220.TA.1 – 19	2′B t	SACM (30); Franco-Belge (5); Fives-Lille (15); Schneider et Cie. (20)	1892–1895	70	1932–	“Ravachol”
3.078 – 3.354	230.A.1 – 247	2′C n4v	Hainaut; SFCM; Schneider et Cie. Franco-Belge; SACM; Fives-Lille; Batignolles; Cockerill; Société Énergie; La Chapelle	1897–1913	277		
2.641 – 2.675	221.A.1 – 35	2′B1 n4v	SACM (20); SFCM (10); Fives-Lille (5)	1900–1904	35		Rebuilt with superheaters
4.446 – 4.460	040.TD.1 – 15	D t	Franco-Belge	1900	15		Renumbered 4.1981 to 4.1995 in 1919, 4.2001 to 4.2015 in 1930
2.231 – 2.305	222.TA.1 – 75	2′B2′ t	Nord (La Chapelle) (48); Nord (Hellemmes) (27)	1901–1906	75		“Revolver”
6.121 – 6.168	031+130.TA.1 – 47	C1′+1′C t	Nord workshops	1905–1911	48		
2.741	—	2′B1 n4v	Schneider et Cie.	1907	1	1913	Water-tube boiler, 4-cylinder compound. Rebuilt to 4-4-4 in 1907. Rebuilt to 4-6-0 nº 3.999 in 1913
4.001 – 4.075, 4.801 – 4.990	040.A.1 – 2	D	Nord (La Chapelle)	1907–15	265		“180” class. 108 rebuilt as tank locomotives 4.301 – 4.400, 4.531 – 4.540 (1907–1913). Renumbered 4.601 – 4.674, 4.701 – 4.954. (tender) and 4.1801 – 4.1908 (tank)
4.301 – 4.400, 4.531 – 4.540	040.TA.1 – 104	D t	(La Chapelle)	1907–1913	(108)		Rebuild of “180” class tender locomotives. Renumbered 4.1801 – 4.1908 in 1919
3.513 – 3.662	230.D.1 – 149	2′C h4v	Nord (Hellemmes); Nord (La Chapelle); Schneider et Cie., Fives-Lille, Henschel, BMAG, Ateliers Gilly	1908–1912	150	1955–1969	First 25 built with saturated boilers, rebuilt with superheaters 1929–1934
VV 4 – 11 (de)	—	2+A1+2 n2t	Buffaud & Robatel	1908–1909	8	1932	Steam railcar
3.801 – 3.865	232.TA.1 – 65	2′C2′ t	SFCM (60); Nord (Hellemmes) (5)	1909–1914	65	1944–1957	

== Georges Asselin (1910–1918) ==
Nord No.	SNCF No.	Type	Manufacturer Serial numbers	Year made	Quantity made	Year(s) withdrawn	Comments
3.1101 – 3.1102	232.A.1	2′C2′ h4v	Nord (La Chapelle)	1911	2	1936–1939	
3.1151 – 3.1170	231.A.1 – 20	2′C1′ h4v	SACM	1912	20	1954–56	
4.061 – 4.340	140.A.1 – 280	1′D h4v	SFCM (147); Nord (La Chapelle) (10); Schneider et Cie. (58); Batignoles (20); Franco-Belge (35); SACM (10)	1912–1928	280	1950–1959	“Les Bœufs”
5.001 – 5.022; 5.031 – 5.120	150.A.1 – 112	1′E	Nord (La Chapelle) (15); Nord (Hellemmes) (7); SFCM (40); SACM (50)	1912–1929	112	1945–57	34 rebuilt as SNCF 150 C 1 – 112
3.999	230.B.1	2′C h4v	Nord (La Chapelle)	(1913)	(1)	1946	Rebuilt from 4-4-2 prototype 2.741.
3.1401 – 3.1402	130.B.1	1′C h2v	Nord (La Chapelle)	1914	2		Prototypes (compound); 3.1402 rebuilt as simple 3.1503
3.1501 – 3.1503	130.C.1 – 3	1′C h2	Nord (La Chapelle)	1913–1914	2		Prototypes (simple)
4.1664 – 4.1700	141.TA.1 – 37	1′D1′ n2t	Canadian Loco. Co.	1916	37	1955–1963	ex ROD #1301 to 1340

== Louis Breville (1918–1928) ==
Nord No.	SNCF No.	Type	Manufacturer Serial numbers	Year made	Quantity made	Year(s) withdrawn	Comments
3.871 – 3.884	232.TB.1 – 14	2′C2′ t	Beyer, Peacock & Company	1914	(14)	1946–1954	ex-ROD locomotives originally ordered by Maatschappij tot Exploitatie van Staatsspoorwegen
4.1301 – 4.1542	140.C.1 – 242	1′D	Baldwin	1917–1919	242	1944–1955	ex-US Army “General Pershing”. Later renumbered 141.G.1702 – 1941
4.1551 – 4.1663	140.B.1 – 108	1′D	Baldwin	1917	113	1937–53	American-built ex-ROD locomotives #1351-1500
4.1101 – 4.1150	141.A.1 – 50	1′D1′ h4v	Baldwin	1918–1919	50	1948–1959	Identical to PLM 1013 – 1129
4.1076	040.B.75	D n2v	Linke-Hofmann	(1915)	(1)		ex Mecklenburg G 7.2, received as war reparations
3.1150	231.B.1	2′C1′ h4v	Fives-Lille	1920	(1)		État type Pacific
3.1201 – 3.1290	231.C.1 – 88	2′C1′ h4v	ANF (50); SFCM (40)	1923–1932	90	1958–1962	“Superpacific”; 4-cylinder compound

== Georges Collin (1928–1931) ==
Nord No.	SNCF No.	Type	Manufacturer Serial numbers	Year made	Quantity made	Year(s) withdrawn	Comments
4.2016 – 4.2095	040.TG.1 – 80	D t	ANF, Corpet-Louvet	1930–33	80	1960–67	
5.601 – 5.670	050.TD.1 – 70	E t	SACM; Fives-Lille	1930	70		
4.1201 – 4.1202	141.TB.1 – 2	1′D1′ h2t	Nord (La Chapelle)	1931	2	1948	renumbered 4.1701 – 4.1702

== Jean Lancrenon (1931–1938) ==
Nord No.	SNCF No.	Type	Manufacturer Serial numbers	Year made	Quantity made	Year(s) withdrawn	Comments
4.1201 – 4.1272	141.TC.1 – 72	1′D1′ h2t	Nord (Hellemmes) (5); SACM (10); ANF (18); Franco-Belge (18); Schneider et Cie. (9); Fives-Lille (6); SFCM (6)	1932–1935	72	1970	
3.1171 – 3.1190	231.E.1 – 20	2′C1′ h4v	SACM, SFCM, Fives-Lille		20	1961–1966	Chapelon Pacific, ex-PO, acquired 1934–1935
3.1249 – 3.1250	231.D.1 – 2	2′C1′ h2	(La Chapelle)	(1934)	(2)	1945	“Superpacific”; rebuilt as 2-cylinder simple
5.301 – 5.312	151.TA.1 – 12	1′E1′ t	Corpet-Louvet	1928–1930	12		Ex Grande Ceinture 5001–5012, acquired 1935
5.1201 – 5.1230	150.C.1 – 30	1′E	Nord (La Chapelle) (8); Nord (Hellemmes) (22)	1933–35	30		
3.1111 – 3.1130	231.E.29 – 48	2′C1′ h4v	Marine et d'Homécourt (10); Fives-Lille (10)	1936–1937	20	1961–1955	Chapelon Pacific, new
3.1191 – 3.1198	231.E.21 – 28	2′C1′ h4v	ANF	1936	8	1961–1966	Chapelon Pacific, new

== Preserved locomotives ==
Image	Nord No.	Series	SNCF No.	UIC type	Manufacturer	Serial No.	Date	Notes
	4.853		—	D n2	Société J. F. Cail & Cie.	1496	1866	“180”, sold to industry in 1921, preserved by AJECTA at Musée vivant du chemin de fer, Longueville, Seine-et-Marne, Monument historique
	701	701	—	2′AA n4v	SACM	3755	1885	Static display, Cité du train, Mulhouse
	3.486	3.401–3.512	—	C n2	SACM	4230	1890	Sold to industry in 1936; later preserved, to Cité du train in 1999.
	2.670	2.641–2.675	221.A.30	2′B1′ n4v	SFCM	2612	1903	Static display, Cité du train, Mulhouse
	3.521	3.513–3.662	230.D.9	2′C n4v	Nord (La Chapelle)	—	1908	Cité du train
	3.628	3.513–3.662	230.D.116	2′C n4v	Henschel & Sohn	10745	1911	Was at Nene Valley Railway, England. Now at Longueville
	3.1102	3.1101–3.1102	—	2′C2′ h4v	Nord (La Chapelle)	—	1911	Sectioned for Exposition Internationale des Arts et Techniques dans la Vie Moderne, Paris 1937; static display, Cité du train, Mulhouse
	4.319	4.061–4.340	140.A.259	1′D h4v	Franco-Belge	2537	1927	Static display (on its side), Cité du train, Mulhouse
	3.1280	3.1201–3.1290	231.C.78	2′C1′ h4v	SFCM	4142	1931	“Superpacific”, streamlined (1936–1946)
	4.1251	4.1201–4.1272	141.TC.51	1′D1′ n2t	Franco-Belge	2696	1934	Exhibited at Brussels International Exposition, 1935. Static display, Cité du train, Mulhouse
	3.1192	3.1171–3.1198	231.E.22	2′C1′ n4v	ANF	421	1936	PO-type, acquired new. Static display, Cité du train, Mulhouse
	3.1123	3.1111–3.1130	231.E.41	2′C1′ n4v	Fives-Lille	4889	1937	PO-type, acquired new. Static display, St-Pierre-Des-Corps, Tours. Monument historique
