= SNCF 150.P =

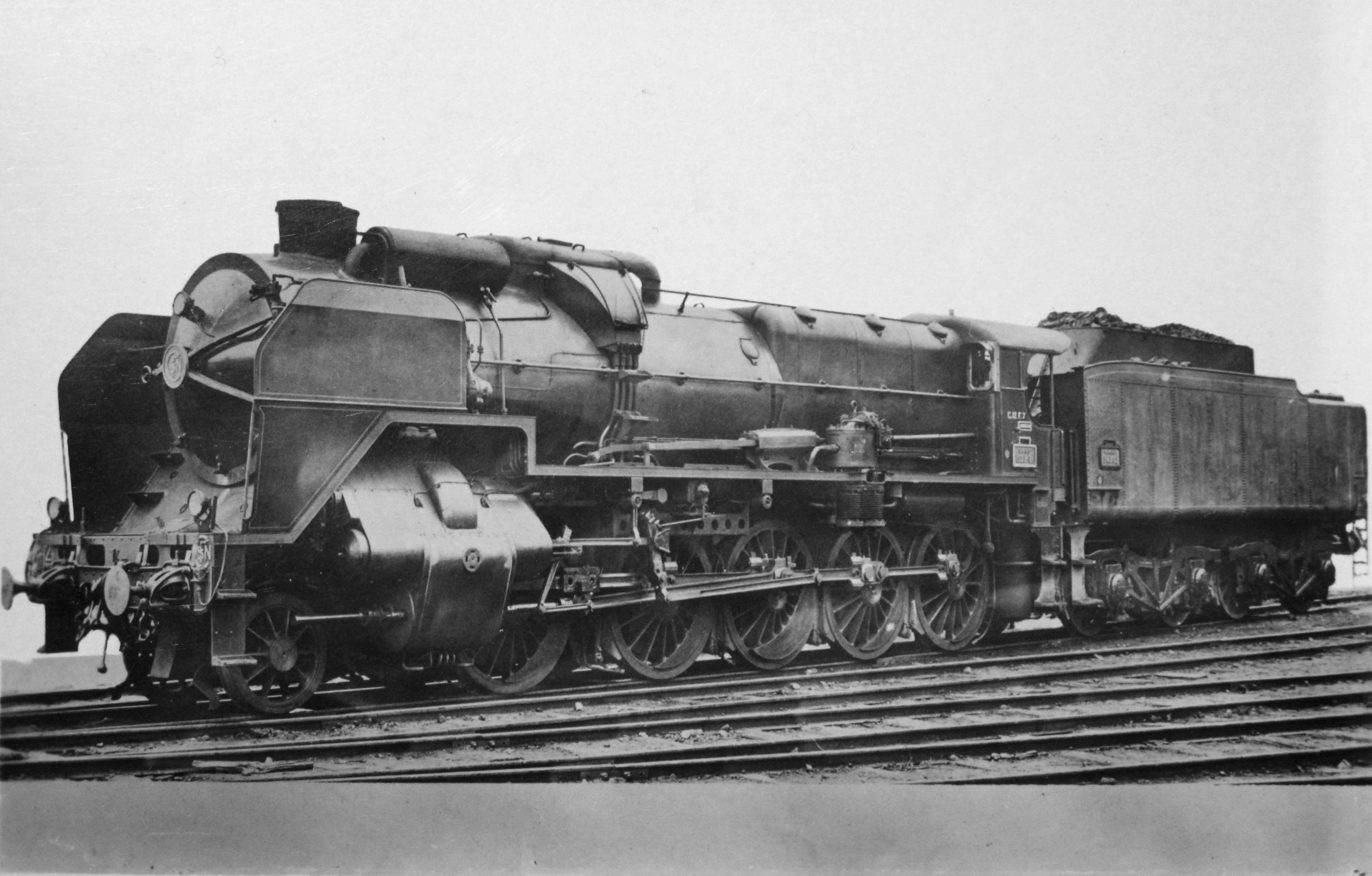
- Builder's photograph of a 150.P
Type and origin
- Power type: Steam
- Builder: ANF (70); SACM (10); ADN (35)
- Build date: April 1940 – April 1950
- Total produced: 115
Specifications
- Configuration
  - Whyte: 2-10-0
  - UIC: 1′E h4v
- Gauge: 1,435 mm (4 ft 8 1/2 in)
- Leading dia.: 950 mm (3 ft 1 3/8 in)
- Driver dia.: 1,550 mm (5 ft 1 in)
- Length: 12.530 m (41 ft 1 1/4 in)
- Width: 3.208 m (10 ft 6 1/4 in)
- Height: 4.248 m (13 ft 11 1/4 in)
- Loco weight: 105.7 tonnes (104.0 long tons; 116.5 short tons)
- Tender type: 34.P, 36.P, 36.Q or 38.P
- Fuel type: Coal
- Water cap.: 34,000–38,000 litres (7,500–8,400 imp gal; 9,000–10,000 US gal)
- Tender cap.: 9 or 12 tonnes (8.9 or 11.8 long tons; 9.9 or 13.2 short tons)
- Firebox
  - Type: Belpaire
  - Grate area: 3.56 m^{2} (38.3 sq ft)
- Boiler pressure: 18 kg/cm^{2} (1.77 MPa; 256 psi)
- Feedwater heater: ACFI
- Heating surface: 193.38 m^{2} (2,081.5 sq ft)
- Superheater
  - Type: 1 to 50: 32-element Schmidt; 51 to 115: Houlet 5P4
  - Heating area: Schmidt: 58.6 m^{2} (631 sq ft); Houlet: 82.1 m^{2} (884 sq ft)
- Cylinders: 4, compound: HP outside, LP inside
- High-pressure cylinder: 490 mm × 640 mm (19 5/16 in × 25 3/16 in)
- Low-pressure cylinder: 680 mm × 700 mm (26 3/4 in × 27 9/16 in)
- Valve gear: Walschaerts
Performance figures
- Maximum speed: 105 km/h (65 mph)
- Power output: 1,450 kW (1,970 PS; 1,940 hp) at 60 km/h (37 mph)
- Tractive effort: 215.3 kN (48,400 lbf)
Career
- Operators: SNCF
- Numbers: 150.P.1 to 150.P.115
- Withdrawn: 1961–1968
- Preserved: 150.P.13
- Disposition: 1 preserved, remainder scrapped

SNCF 150.P were a class of 2-10-0 “Decapod” steam locomotives built as standard locomotives of the newly created SNCF between April 1940 and April 1950

== Origins ==
The class were built by:

- Ateliers de construction du Nord de la France (ANF), Blanc-Misseron,
- Société Alsacienne de Constructions Mécaniques (SACM), Graffenstaden,
- Aciéries du Nord (ADN), Hautmont.

Table of orders and numbers
Year	Quantity	Manufacturer	Serial No.	SNCF No.
1940	15	ANF	430–444	150.P.1 – 15
1941–42	10	SACM	7776–7785	150.P.16 – 25
1940-41	25	ADN	—	150.P.26 – 50
1942	10	ADN	—	150.P.51 – 60
1942	15	ANF	445–459	150.P.61 – 75
1945–46	15	ANF	465–474	150.P.76 – 90
1949	10	ANF	512–521	150.P.91 – 100
1950	15	ANF	522–536	150.P.101 – 115

The 115 locomotives were delivered between 16 April 1940 and 15 April 1950. They were, in effect a continuation, with improvements, of a Nord design, Nord 5.1201 to 5.1230 (SNCF 2-150.B.1 to 30); they were ordered due to a shortage locomotives for heavy trains.

The first 50 locomotives were requisitioned by Germany for the Deutsche Reichsbahn, some as soon as they left the factory. Three locomotives, 150.P.14, 40 and 49, were never returned; although it was April 1953 before they were struck off the roster. In addition, one locomotive, 150.P.19, was destroyed during World War II and written off in February 1945.

== Service ==
The locomotives were allocated to the SNCF's Nord Region, but after 1956, many were transferred to the Est Region for heavy coal, ore and steel trains as well as general freight. On the Nord Region they were allocated to the following depots: Lens, Valenciennes, Longueau, Somain, Béthune, Le Bourget and Aulnoye. On the Est Region they were allocated to Chalindrey, then Chaumont.

As electrification spread on the Nord Region, 45 locomotives were transferred to Est Region. The last Nord examples were 2-150.P.93 and 103 which were withdrawn on 17 March 1967, after only 18 years' service. On the Est Region they only lasted a few months longer; the last one, 1-150.P.86, was withdraw on 19 February 1968, after having worked 954,500 kilometres (593,100 miles).

Outside their allocated region, they also worked onto the Ouest Region with Longueau locomotives working Rouen to Amiens freights; and the Sud-Est Region with Chalindrey and Chaumont locomotives working Chalindrey to Dijon freights.

Only one locomotive has been preserved: 150.P.13, which was at the Cité du Train, but is now kept at the Mohon roundhouse.

Table of withdrawals
Year	Quantity in service at start of year	Quantity withdrawn	Locomotives numbers
1961	111	4	150.P.45, 72, 73, 76
1962	107	22	150.P.1, 2, 4, 10, 11, 16, 18, 20, 23, 25, 31, 36, 48, 50, 53–55, 57, 58, 60, 64, 80
1963	85	10	150.P.21,22, 27, 32, 38, 39, 47, 62, 63, 75
1964	75	12	150.P.6, 15, 17, 29, 33, 34, 41, 59, 70, 74, 79, 83
1965	63	34	150.P.3, 5, 7, 9, 12, 26, 28, 30, 37, 42–44, 46, 67, 68, 71, 77, 81, 82, 84, 85, 87–92, 94, 95, 97, 99, 100, 105, 112
1966	29	14	150.P.8, 24, 52, 61, 65, 66, 69, 96, 101, 106–109, 115
1967	15	14	150.P.13, 35, 51, 56, 78, 93, 98, 102–104, 110, 111, 113, 114
1968	1	1	150.P.86

== Description ==
The 150.P locomotives had chassis made of 35-millimetre (1 3/8 in) plate steel, which gave great rigidity. The Decapods were a four-cylinder compound, with the two high-pressure cylinders outside and the two low-pressure cylinders inside; they were manufactured as a single moobloc casting. The valve gear was of the Walschaerts type, with the inside cylinders connected to the second pair of driving wheels, and the outside to the middle pair. The Belpaire firebox had a Nicholson thermic syphon; with a long and narrow grate.; the boiler was identical to those used on the 2-150.B locomotives. They had an HT1 mechanical stoker (except for 150.P.16 to 25 and 40 to 50). They were fitted with a variable Lemaître exhaust, and an ACFI feedwater heater The lead bissel truck was of the Nord pattern, with a lateral displacement of ±65 millimetres or 2 9/16 inches; it was also connected to the leading driving axle which had a lateral displacement of ±15 millimetres or 9/16 inch. The minimum radius was they could traverse was 105 metres (344 ft). They were fitted with smoke deflectors.

== Tender ==
The tenders which were attached to the locomotives were always bogie tenders and one of four types: Most had a stoker-equipped tender holding 34,000 litres (7,500 imp gal; 9,000 US gal) of water and 12 tonnes (12 long tons; 13 short tons) of coal; these were numbered 34.P.1 to 418. The alternative tenders were two types holding 36,000 litres (7,900 imp gal; 9,500 US gal) of water and 9 tonnes (8.9 long tons; 9.9 short tons) of coal: 36.P.1 to 29, and (much more rarely) 36.Q.1 to 11. These two designs differed only in the design of the coal bunker and were derived from the Nord's 37,000-litre (8,100 imp gal; 9,800 US gal) tender. They were also used with the 241.P and 141.P classes. The locomotives that did not have the HT1 stoker were fitted with tenders holding 38,000 litres (8,400 imp gal; 10,000 US gal) of water and 9 tonnes of coal; these were numbered 38.P.1 to 21.

== Gallery ==
150.P.13 was exhibited at the Grand Palais, Paris in an event titled "L'art entre en gare" to mark the 70th anniversary of the SNCF.

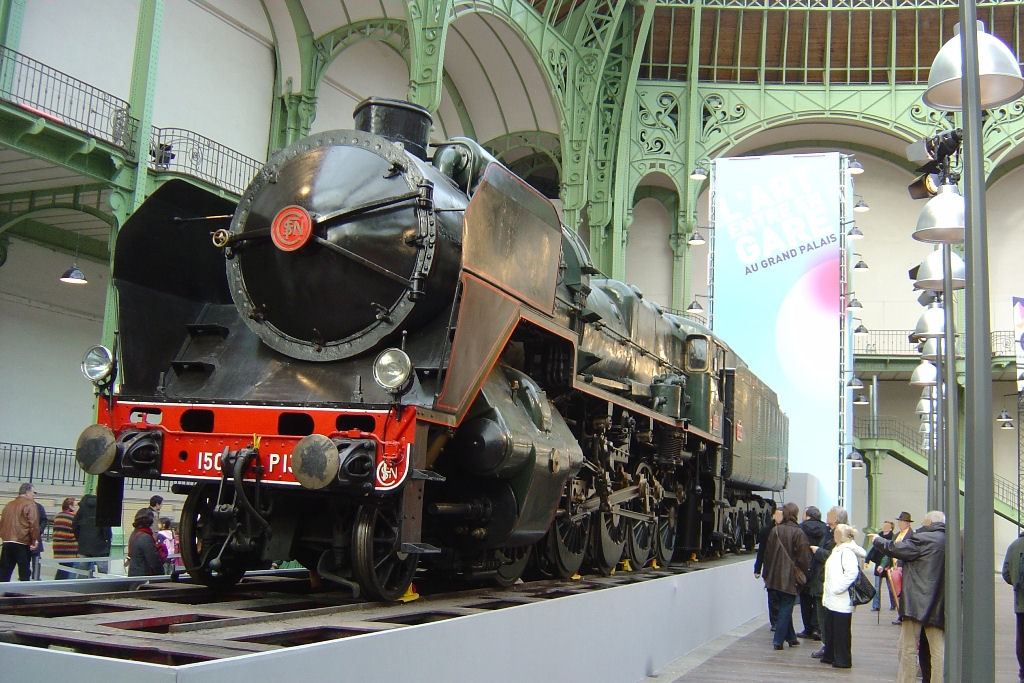
150.P.13

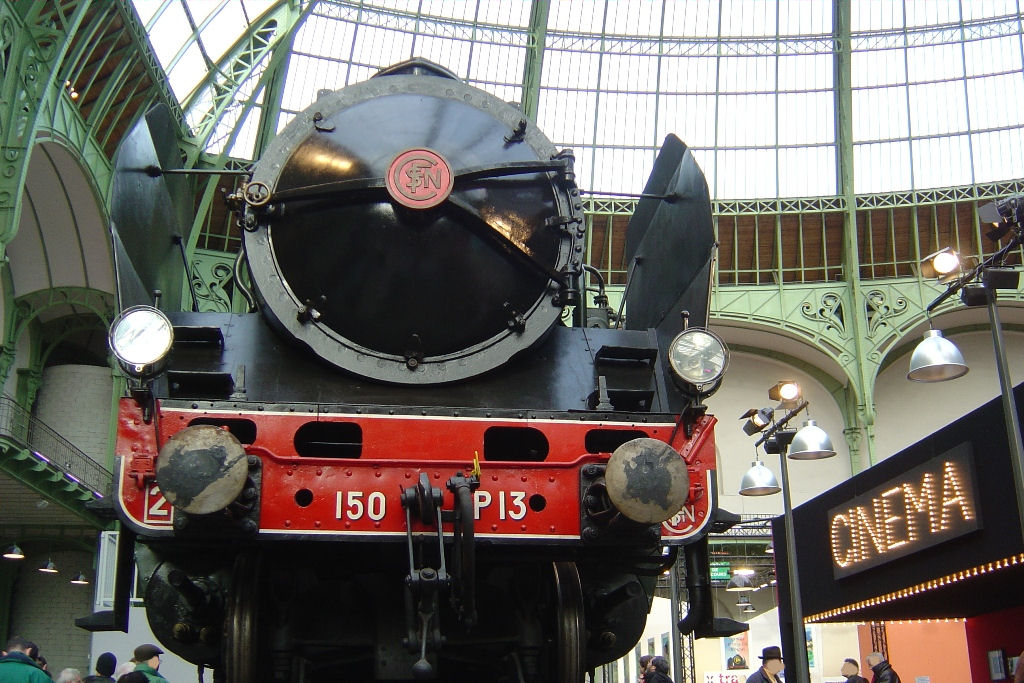
Head-on view showing the Nord-type smoke box door

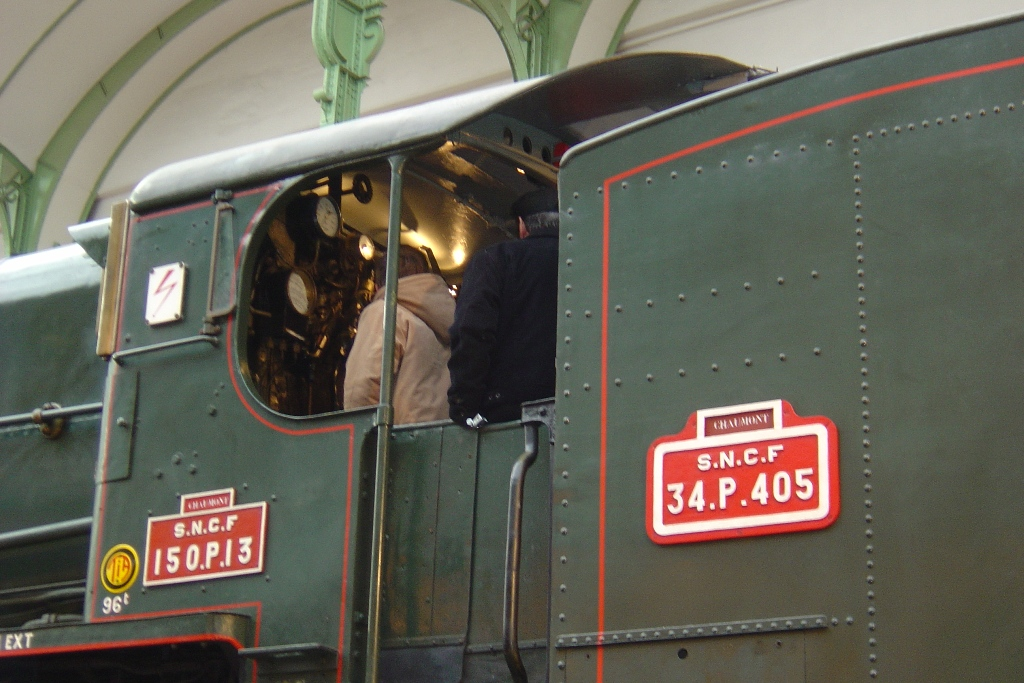
A view into the cab, also showing the locomotive and tender number plates

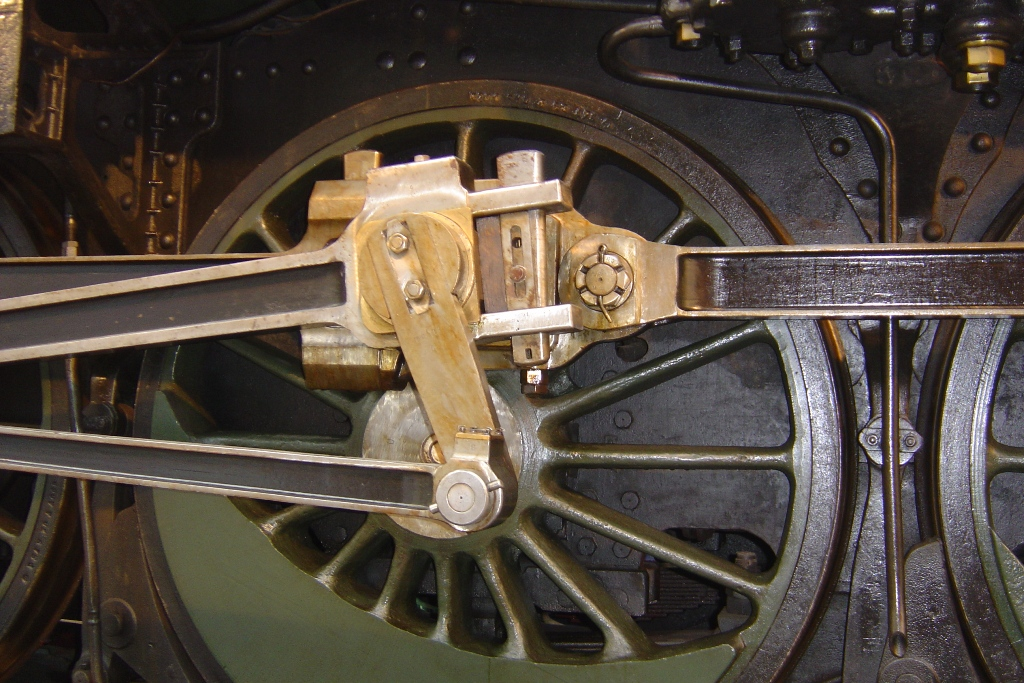
Middle driving wheel

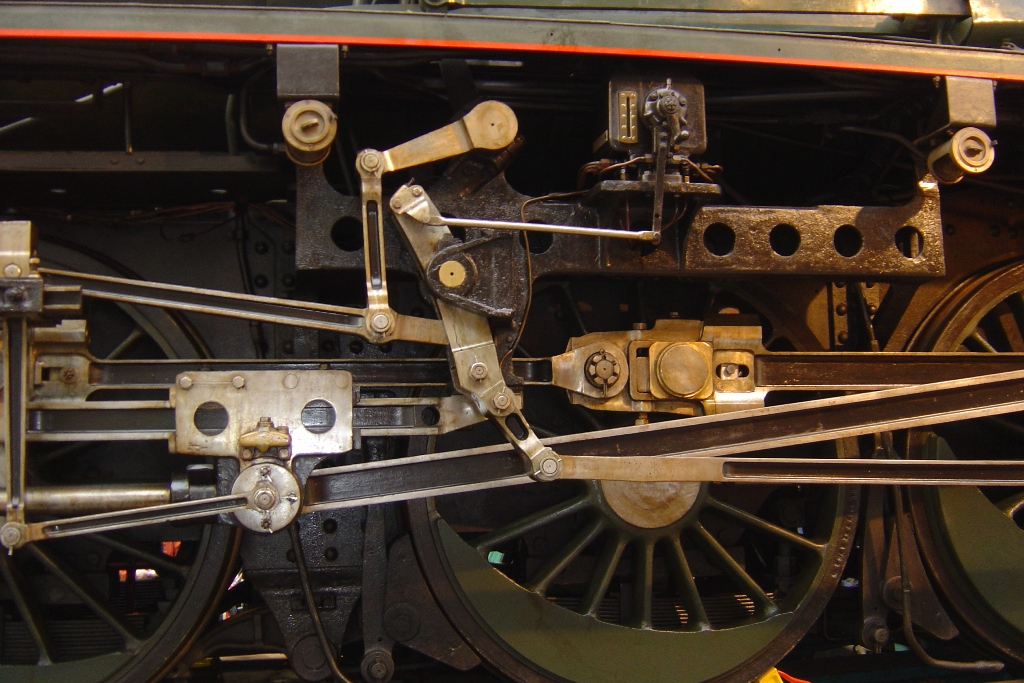
Crosshead

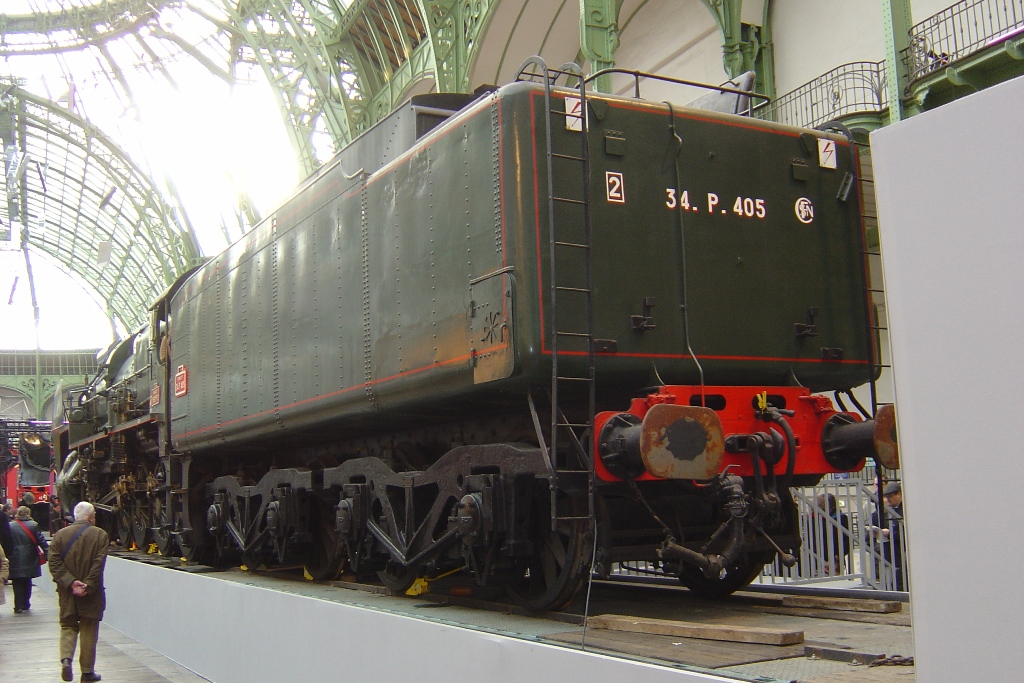
Tender 34.P.405 attached to 150.P.13

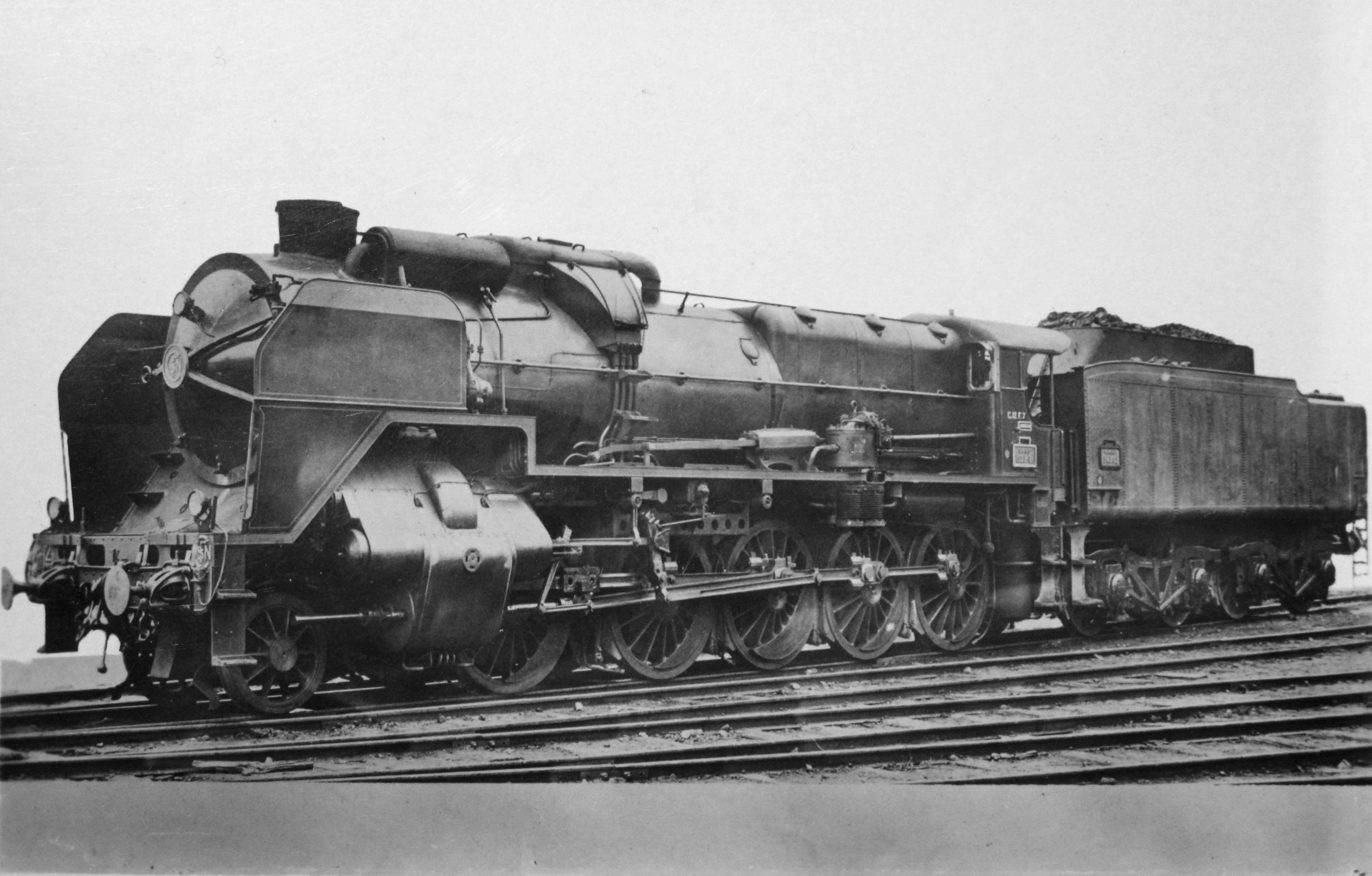
