= Nord 5.1201 to 5.1230 =

Nord 5.1201 – 5.1230 SNCF 2-150.B
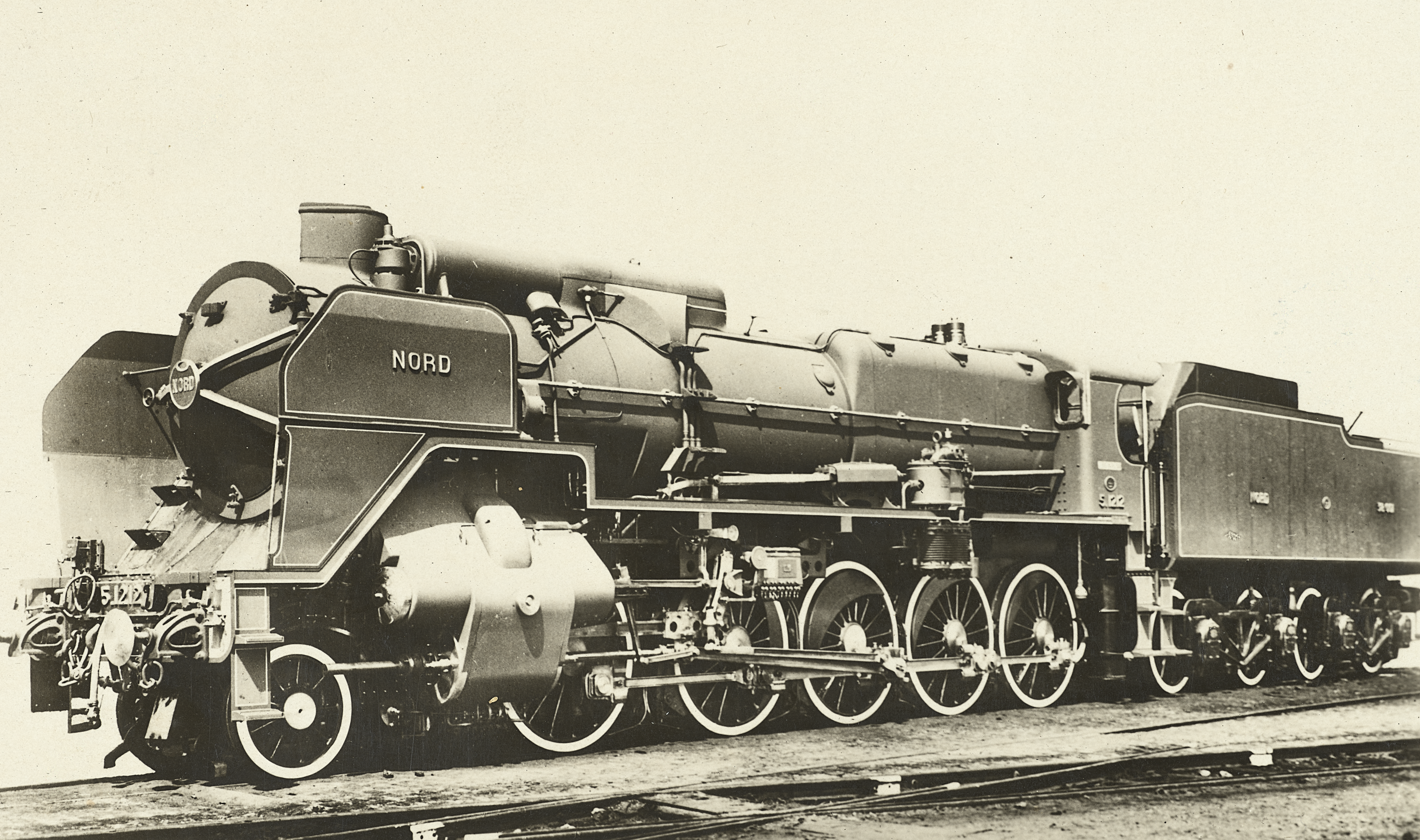
- Nord 5.1212
Type and origin
- Power type: Steam
- Designer: Marc de Caso
- Builder: Nord – La Chapelle; Nord – Hellemmes
- Build date: 1933–1935
- Total produced: 30
Specifications
- Configuration
  - Whyte: 2-10-0
  - UIC: 1′E h4v
- Driver dia.: 1,550 mm (5 ft 1 in)
- Loco weight: 104.32 tonnes (102.67 long tons; 114.99 short tons)
- Tender weight: 76.90 tonnes (75.69 long tons; 84.77 short tons)
- Fuel capacity: 9,000 kg (20,000 lb)
- Water cap.: 37,000 litres (8,100 imp gal; 9,800 US gal)
- Firebox
  - Type: Belpaire
  - Grate area: 3.50 m^{2} (37.7 sq ft)
- Boiler pressure: 18 kg/cm^{2} (1.77 MPa; 256 psi)
- Heating surface: 193 m^{2} (2,080 sq ft)
- Superheater
  - Heating area: 63.8 m^{2} (687 sq ft)
- Cylinders: Four, compound: High pressure outside, Low pressure inside
- High-pressure cylinder: 490 mm × 640 mm (19 5/16 in × 25 3/16 in)
- Low-pressure cylinder: 680 mm × 700 mm (26 3/4 in × 27 9/16 in)
Performance figures
- Power output: 2,360 hp (1,760 kW)
Career
- Operators: Nord; SNCF
- Class: Nord: 5.1200; SNCF: 2-150.B
- Numbers: Nord: 5-1201 – 5.1230; SNCF: 2-150.B.1 – 2-150.B.30
- Locale: Northern France
- Disposition: All scrapped

Nord 5.1201 to 5.1230 were a class of 2-10-0 “Decapod” steam locomotives of the Chemins de Fer du Nord, designed to handle heavy coal trains. On 1 January 1938, they all passed to the SNCF, who numbered them 2-150.B.1 to 30.

== History ==
The history of the locomotives starts in 1932, when to cope with increased traffic levels, Marc de Caso designed a new class of 2-10-0 Decapod locomotives: the 5.1200s, later to become the SNCF 2–150.B.

In order to increase standardisation, and to reduce operating and maintenance costs, the 5.1200s shared many parts with the third series of Super Pacifics (3.1251 to 3.1290) and the suburban Mikado tank locomotives (4.1200 to 4.1272).

== Construction ==
The class was built between 1933 and 1935 by the Nord's workshops at La Chapelle and Hellemmes-Lille.

Table of orders
Nord N°	SNCF N°	Quantity	Manufacturer	Year	Comments
5.1201 to 5.1208	2–150.B.1 to 2–150.B.8	8	La Chapelle	1933	prototypes
5.1209 to 5.1230	2–150.B.9 to 2–150.B.30	22	Hellemmes	1933–35	

== Description ==
=== Locomotive ===
The 5.1200s had the same boiler as the Super Pacifics; the Belpaire firebox was riveted and made of copper. The front end, consisting of four cylinders, was a steel monobloc casting.

Originally, they were hand-fired, but the coal consumption was such that in 1934, 10 locomotives of the class were fitted with mechanical stokers. The results were so successful, that the remainder of the class was later equipped as well.

=== Tenders ===
The 5.1200s were equipped with type 38.A tenders at the start of their career. Some had type 37.A; while later some were coupled to type 36.A

=== Livery ===
The 5.1200s were delivered in the Nord's standard livery of chocolate brown with yellow lining; bufferbeams were red, edged in white. This livery was applied to all of the company's compound locomotives.

After nationalisation in 1938, the SNCF livery – No.306 exterior green and black with yellow lining – was gradually applied. The locomotives did not carry the SNCF's standard cabside number plates, but had the details painted on, which was standard practice on the Région Nord.

== Models ==
The 5.1200s have been modelled in O scale by the Swiss company Lemaco.

== See also ==
- List of Chemins de Fer du Nord locomotives
