= Nord 401 to 436 =

Type and origin
- Power type: Steam
- Build date: 1856–1857
- Total produced: 36
Specifications
- Configuration
  - Whyte: 0-4-6T
  - UIC: B3 n2t
- Gauge: 1,435 mm (4 ft 8 1/2 in)
- Driver dia.: 1,753 mm (5 ft 9 in)
- Wheelbase: 8.00 m (26 ft 3 in)
- Length: 11.71 m (38 ft 5 in)
- Adhesive weight: 27.5 t (60,600 lb)
- Loco weight: 47.5 t (105,000 lb)
- Fuel type: Coal
- Firebox
  - Type: Crampton
  - Grate area: 1.41 m^{2} (15.2 sq ft)
- Boiler pressure: 7.5–8.5 kg/cm^{2} (0.735–0.834 MPa; 107–121 psi)
- Heating surface: 121 m^{2} (1,300 sq ft)
- Cylinders: Two, inside
- Cylinder size: 420 mm × 560 mm (16 9/16 in × 22 1/16 in)
- Valve gear: Stephenson
Career
- Operators: Chemins de Fer du Nord
- Numbers: Nord (1845): 401 – 436; Nord (1872): 2.401 – 2.436

Nord 401 to 436, renumbered to Nord 2.401 to 2.436 in 1872, were 0-4-6T Engerth locomotives for mixed traffic of the Chemins de Fer du Nord. The machines were built in 1856–1857 and retired from service in the early 1900s.

== Construction history ==
The machines were built by Maschinenfabrik Esslingen (Emil Kessler), Charbonnier et Cie. (successors to the business of François Cavé), and Nord works at La Chapelle in 1856–1857. The locomotives were 0-4-6T Engerth locomotives for mixed traffic. The Stephenson valve gear and the cylinders were on the inside of the locomotive frame. The tender contained 4.5–5.5 m^{3} (159–194 cu ft) of water and 1,500–1,600 kg (3,310–3,530 lb) of coal.

Twelve machines were rebuilt as 0-4-2 tender locomotives between 1873 and 1878 at Nord (La Chapelle).

Table of locomotives.
Year	Quantity	Manufacturer	Serial numbers	Nord numbers (pre-1872)	Nord numbers (post-1872
1855	6	Maschinenfabrik Esslingen	283–288	401–406	2.401–2.406
1855	9	Charbonnier et Cie.	111–119	407–415	2.407–2.415
1856	11	Charbonnier et Cie.	120–130	416–426	2.416–2.426
1857	10	Nord (La Chapelle)	—	427–436	2.427–2.436

== Service history ==
The machines were used for mixed service on many of the main and secondary lines of the Nord network. In 1904 there were still 15 machines remaining in service, Nord 2.401, 2.406, 2.408, 2.409, 2.410, 2.411, 2.412, 2.413, 2.415, 2.418, 2.425, 2.426, 2.430, 2.433, and 2.434.
