= Ceinture 5001 to 5012 =

Ceinture 5001–5012 Nord 5.301 – 5.312 SNCF 2-151.TA
Type and origin
- Power type: Steam
- Designer: Henschel & Sohn and Corpet-Louvet
- Builder: Corpet-Louvet
- Serial number: 1749, 1774–1783
- Build date: 1928 (1), 1930 (11)
- Total produced: 12
Specifications
- Configuration
  - Whyte: 2-10-2T
  - UIC: 1′E1′ h2t
- Gauge: 1,435 mm (4 ft 8 1/2 in)
- Leading dia.: 800 mm (31 1/2 in)
- Driver dia.: 1,350 mm (4 ft 5 1/8 in)
- Trailing dia.: 800 mm (31 1/2 in)
- Length: 15.530 metres (50 ft 11 3/8 in)
- Loco weight: Empty: 90.7 tonnes (89.3 long tons; 100.0 short tons); Loaded 114.8 tonnes (113.0 long tons; 126.5 short tons)
- Firebox
  - Grate area: 3.55 m^{2} (38.2 sq ft)
- Boiler pressure: 12 kg/cm^{2} (1.18 MPa; 171 psi)
- Feedwater heater: ACFI
- Heating surface: 167 m^{2} (1,800 sq ft)
- Superheater
  - Type: 5P4 type
  - Heating area: 89 m^{2} (960 sq ft)
- Cylinders: Two, outside
- Cylinder size: 630 mm × 660 mm (24 13/16 in × 26 in)
Performance figures
- Maximum speed: 70 km/h (43 mph)
- Power output: 1,300 CV (960 kW; 1,300 hp)
Career
- Operators: Ceinture; Nord; SNCF
- Numbers: Ceinture: 5001–5012; Nord: 5.301 – 5.312; SNCF: 2-151.TA.1 – 2-151.TA.12
- Retired: 1962–1965
- Current owner: all scrapped

Ceinture 5001 to 5012 were a class of 2-10-2T tank locomotives of the Syndicat d'Exploitation des Chemins de fer de Ceinture de Paris. They were used for hauling freight trains on the Grande Ceinture line in Paris, and later the Région Nord.

The locomotives were designed jointly by the firm of Corpet-Louvet and Henschel & Sohn, and were based on the Prussian T 20. They were delivered to the Ceinture between 1928 and 1930, who numbered them 5001 to 5012.

In 1934, at the dissolution of the Syndicat, they transferred to the Chemins de fer du Nord who renumbered them 5.301 to 5.312.

In 1938, at the creation of the SNCF, they became 2-151.TA.1 to 2–151.TA.12. The SNCF ordered a further 22 of this type, but with the higher boiler pressure of 14 kg/cm^{2} (1.37 MPa; 199 psi), as the 151.TQ type.

They were retired between 1962 and 1965. None have been preserved.

Table of retirements
Year	Quantity in service at start of year	Quantity withdrawn	Fleet numbers
1962	12	3	151.TA.2, 3, 10
1963	9	4	151.TA.1, 4, 5, 6
1964	5	3	151.TA.7, 9, 12
1965	2	2	151.TA.8, 11

== See also ==
- List of Chemins de Fer du Nord locomotives
