= Nord 360 to 399 =

0-8-4T Engerth locomotives for freight traffic

Type and origin
- Power type: Steam
- Build date: 1856–1857
- Total produced: 40
Specifications
- Configuration
  - Whyte: 0-8-4T
  - UIC: D2 n2t
- Gauge: 1,435 mm (4 ft 8 1/2 in)
- Driver dia.: 1.26 m (4 ft 1 5/8 in)
- Wheelbase: 8.70 m (28 ft 6 1/2 in)
- Length: 11.35 m (37 ft 3 in)
- Adhesive weight: 43–39 t (94,800–86,000 lb)
- Loco weight: 67–62 t (148,000–137,000 lb)
- Fuel type: Coal
- Firebox
  - Type: Crampton
  - Grate area: 1.97 m^{2} (21.2 sq ft)
- Boiler pressure: 7.5 kg/cm^{2} (0.735 MPa; 107 psi)
- Heating surface: 165–195 m^{2} (1,780–2,100 sq ft)
- Cylinders: Two, outside
- Cylinder size: 500 mm × 660 mm (19 11/16 in × 26 in)
- Valve gear: Gooch
Career
- Operators: Chemins de Fer du Nord
- Numbers: Nord (Pre-1872): 360 – 399; Nord (1872): 4.361 – 4.400

Nord 360 to 399, renumbered to Nord 4.361 to 4.400 in 1872, were 0-8-4T Engerth locomotives for freight traffic of the Chemins de Fer du Nord. The machines were built in 1856–1857 and retired from service in 1907–1910.

== Construction history ==
The machines were built by Schneider and Grafenstaden in 1856–1857. The 0-8-4T locomotives were of a modified Engerth design, with the articulated two-axle tender being supported by the fourth driving axle. The firebox was as of the Crampton type. The boiler consisted of three boiler shells with a Crampton regulator located at the extreme front. The cylinders were on the outside of the locomotive frame and the locomotives had a Gooch valve gear.

Table of orders and numbers
Year	Quantity	Pre-1872 No.	Post-1872 No.	Manufacturer	Serial number
1855	10	370–399	4.400, 4.371–4.379	Schneider et Cie	212–221
1855	20	370–399	4.380–4.399	Schneider et Cie	247–266
1857	10	360–369	4.370, 4.361–4.369	Graffenstaden	1 – 10

The machines were used for heavy coal trains and freight service.
