= Nord 4.1201 to 4.1272 =

Nord 4.1201 – 4.1272 SNCF 2-141.TC
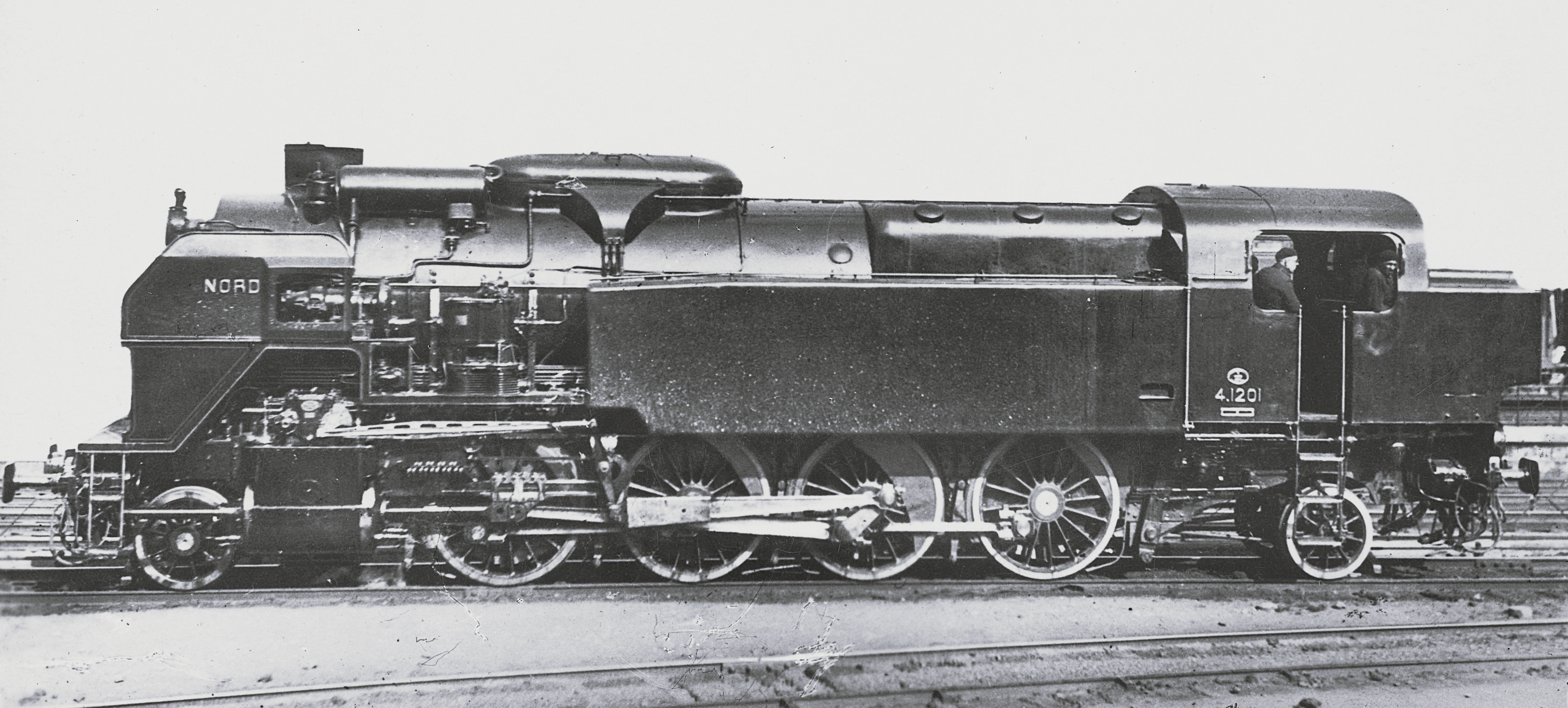
- Nord 4.1201 (1932)
Type and origin
- Power type: Steam
- Designer: Marc de Caso
- Builder: CF du Nord, Hellemmes Works (5); SACM (10); ANF (18); Société Franco-Belge (18); Schneider-Creusot (9); Fives-Lille (6); SFCM (6)
- Build date: 1932–1935
- Total produced: 72
Specifications
- Configuration
  - Whyte: 2-8-2T
  - UIC: 1′D1′ h2t
- Gauge: 1,435 mm (4 ft 8 1/2 in)
- Driver dia.: 1,550 mm (61.02 in)
- Loco weight: 122,500 kg (270,100 lb; 120.6 long tons)
- Fuel type: Coal
- Fuel capacity: 4,000 kg (8,800 lb; 3.9 long tons)
- Water cap.: 10,000 L (2,200 imp gal; 2,600 US gal)
- Firebox
  - Grate area: 3.08 m^{2} (33.2 sq ft)
- Boiler pressure: Originally: 1.8 MPa (261 lbf/in^{2}); later: 1.6 MPa (232 lbf/in^{2})
- Heating surface: 203.83 m^{2} (2,194.0 sq ft)
- Superheater
  - Heating area: 64.25 m^{2} (691.6 sq ft)
- Cylinders: Two, outside
- Cylinder size: Originally: 640 mm × 700 mm (25.20 in × 27.56 in); later: 585 mm × 700 mm (23.03 in × 27.56 in)
- Valve gear: Cossart rotary cam
Performance figures
- Power output: Originally: 2,140 PS (1,570 kW; 2,110 hp)
- Tractive effort: Originally: 282.9 kN (63,600 lbf); later: 210.4 kN (47,300 lbf)
Career
- Operators: Chemin de fer du Nord; → SNCF
- Locale: Northern France
- Withdrawn: 1959–1970
- Disposition: One preserved, remainder scrapped

Nord 4.1201 to 4.1272 was a class of French Mikado tank locomotives built for suburban service on the Chemin de fer du Nord's lines that are north of Paris.

They were designed by Marc de Caso, an engineer working in the company's engineering design office. They were equipped with the same boiler as the Nord's "Superpacifics" (3.1251 to 3.1290) They also had "Cossart" type rotary cam actuated valve gear.

The series were renumbered 2-141.TC.1 to 2-141.TC.72 by SNCF after its creation in 1938; the class was still in service until December 12, 1970, when the use of steam traction on the Nord commuter network had ended.

== Construction history ==
The 72 locomotives were built from 1932 until 1935 by seven manufacturers, including the railway's own workshops at Hellemmes, Lille

Table of locomotive orders
Year	Qty	Manufacturer	Serial No.	Nord No.	SNCF No.	Notes
1932–33	5	Hellemmes	—	4.1201 – 4.1205	2-141.TC.1 to 2-141.TC.5	
1933–34	10	SACM	7688–7697	4.1206 – 4.1215	2-141.TC.6 to 2-141.TC.15	
1934	10	ANF	402–411	4.1216 – 4.1225	2-141.TC.16 to 2-141.TC.25	
1933–34	10	SFB	2679–2688	4.1226 – 4.1235	2-141.TC.26 to 2-141.TC.35	
1934–35	8	ANF	412–419	4.1236 – 4.1243	2-141.TC.36 to 2-141.TC.43	
1934	8	SFB	2689–2696	4.1244 – 4.1251	2-141.TC.44 to 2-141.TC.51	
1934	9	Schneider	4638–4646	4.1252 – 4.1260	2-141.TC.52 to 2-141.TC.60	
1934	6	Fives-Lille	4849–4854	4.1261 – 4.1266	2-141.TC.61 to 2-141.TC.66	
1934–35	6	SFCM	4254–4259	4.1267 – 4.1272	2-141.TC.67 to 2-141.TC.72	

From 1936, as an economy measure, the boiler pressure was reduced from 1.8 to 1.6 megapascals (260 to 230 lbf/in^{2}), and the cylinder bore was reduced from 640 to 585 millimetres (25.20 to 23.03 in). This reduced the tractive effort from 266.37 to 197.38 kilonewtons (59,880 to 44,370 lbf).

== Service history ==
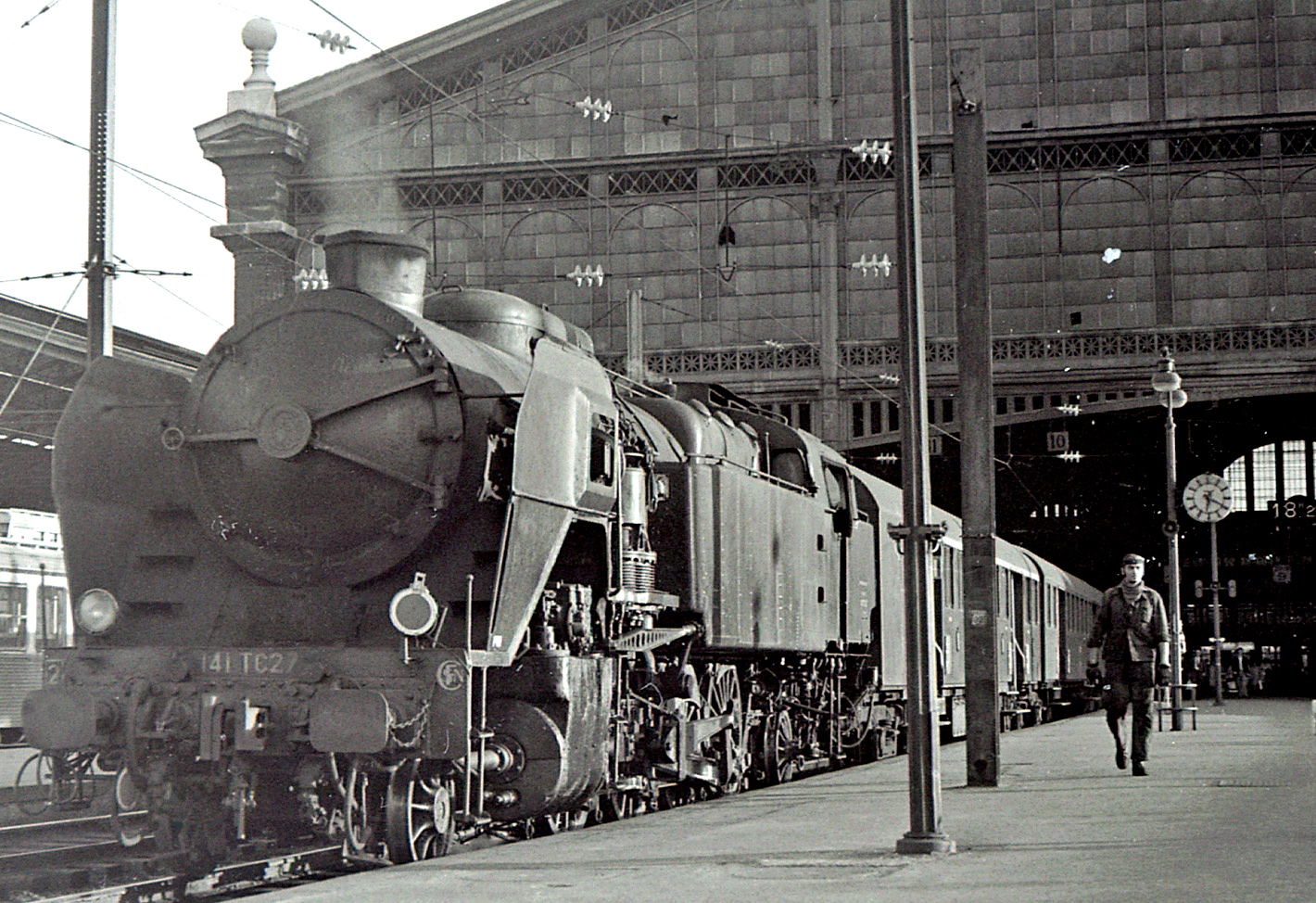
SNCF 2-141.TC.27 at Paris Gare du Nord, late August 1970

In 1935, the 4.1200s essentially provide commuter services at the head of push-pull trains composed of five to nine cars, up to 420 tons gross. They are assigned in part to depots of Joncherolles, Mitry, Beaumont ... They are found between Paris on the one hand and Ermont, Creil and Pontoise on the other. In addition to the commuter traffic, 4.1200's also take charge of the freight service between Persian-Beaumont and Luzarches with reversal at Montsoult.

The beginning of the end began in 1969 and the last two trains to have been powered by 2-141.TC ran on December 12, 1970, with train 1731 between Paris-Nord and Valmondois via Ermont-Eaubonne (with 2-141.TC.64), and train 1748 between Persian-Beaumont and Paris-Nord via Valmondois and Ermont-Eaubonne (with 2-141.TC.54)

== Preservation ==
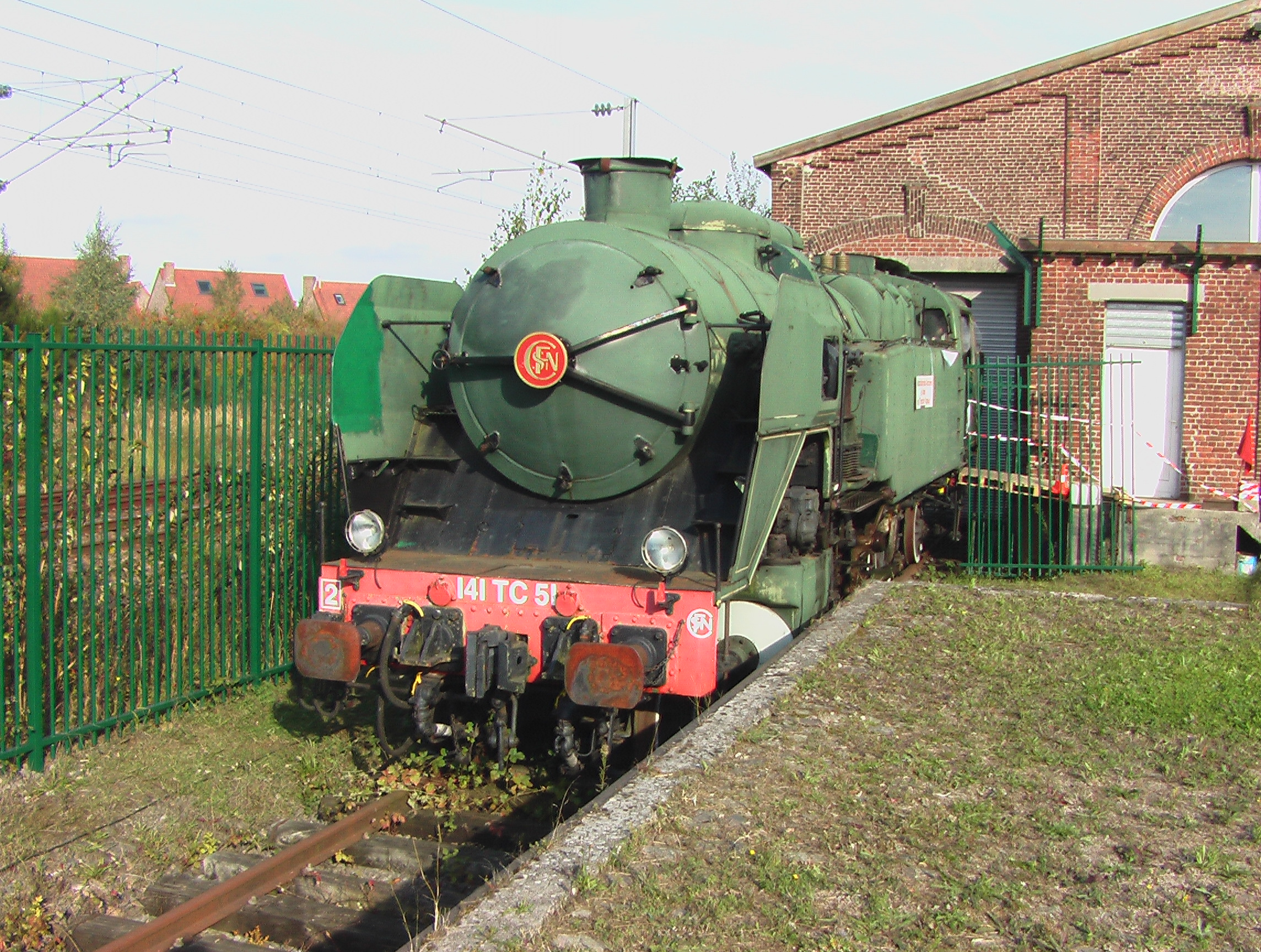
141.TC.51 stored at Ascq

One locomotive has been preserved: 4.1251 / 2-141.TC.51 (SFB 2696 of 1934). This locomotive was featured in an exhibition at the Brussels International Exposition, in 1935. It has since been preserved by AAATV of Lille, and stored at Ascq.

== Models ==
The 4.1200s / 2-141.TCs have been reproduced in HO scale by:

- RMA (French firm), brass injected model, released in 1987, 20 years after being announced
- Keyser (English craftsman), as a white metal kit
- Metropolitan (or Metrop) (high-end Swiss), brass model
- Fulgurex (high-end Swiss), very fine brass model.

== See also ==
- List of Chemins de Fer du Nord locomotives
