= Nord 4.061 to 4.340 =

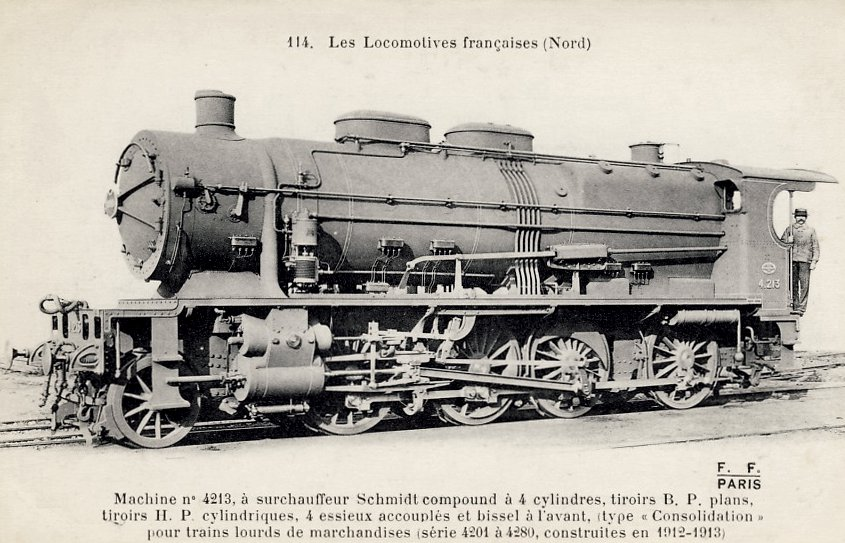
- Nord 4.213 (Schneider 3214 of 1913)
Type and origin
- Power type: Steam
- Designer: Georges Asselin
- Builder: Nord (La Chapelle) (10); Schneider et Cie. (58); Batignolles (20); Société Franco-Belge (35); SFCM (147); SACM (10)
- Build date: 1912–1928
- Total produced: 280
Specifications
- Configuration
  - Whyte: 2-8-0
  - UIC: 1′D h4v
- Gauge: 1,435 mm (4 ft 8 1/2 in)
- Leading dia.: 1,040 mm (3 ft 5 in)
- Driver dia.: 1,550 mm (5 ft 1 in)
- Length: approx. 13 m (42 ft 8 in)
- Width: 3.006 m (9 ft 10 1/4 in)
- Height: 4.240 m (13 ft 11 in)
- Adhesive weight: 75.7 tonnes (74.5 long tons; 83.4 short tons)
- Loco weight: 86.5 tonnes (85.1 long tons; 95.3 short tons)
- Tender weight: 17.A: 38.575 tonnes (37.966 long tons; 42.522 short tons)
- Tender type: Originally: 17.A, later 19.A, 22.A, 24.A, 31.A, and 34.A
- Fuel type: Coal
- Firebox
  - Type: Belpaire
  - Grate area: 3.22 m^{2} (34.7 sq ft)
- Boiler pressure: 16 or 17 kg/cm^{2} (1.57 or 1.67 MPa; 228 or 242 psi)
- Heating surface: 212.98 m^{2} (2,292.5 sq ft)
- Superheater
  - Type: 24-element
  - Heating area: 45.35 m^{2} (488.1 sq ft)
- Cylinders: Four, compound HP outside, LP inside
- High-pressure cylinder: 420 mm × 640 mm (16 9/16 in × 25 3/16 in)
- Low-pressure cylinder: 570 mm × 700 mm (22 7/16 in × 27 9/16 in)
- Valve gear: Walschaerts
- Valve type: HP: 200-millimetre (7 7/8 in) piston valves; LP: Compensated slide valves
Performance figures
- Maximum speed: 105 km/h (65 mph)
- Power output: 1,380 hp (1,030 kW)
Career
- Operators: Chemins de fer du Nord; SNCF
- Class: SNCF: 2-140.A
- Numbers: Nord: 4.061 to 4.340; SNCF: 2-140.A.1 to 2-140.A.280
- Nicknames: les Bœufs
- Withdrawn: 1950–1959
- Preserved: One: Nord 4.319 / SNCF 2-140.259

Nord 4.061 to 4.340 were a class of 2-8-0 tender goods locomotives of the Chemins de fer du Nord. At nationalisation on 1 January 1938, they all passed to the SNCF who renumbered them 2-140.A.1 to 2-140.A.280.

== Origins ==
Faced with increasingly heavy goods trains, the Chemins de fer du Nord decided to replace the 3.078 to 3.354 series mixed traffic 4-6-0s (later SNCF 2-230.A) with more powerful locomotives: the 4.000 series 2-8-0s (later SNCF 2.140.A) and the 5.000 series 2-10-0s (later SNCF 2-150.A). Designed as heavy goods locomotives, the class gained the nickname of “les Bœufs” (“Oxen”).

The design used the same boiler as the Nord's first 4-6-2 Pacifics, the 3.1150 series; they had Belpaire fireboxes, a steam dome on the first boiler ring, and a sandbox on the second. The boiler has 90 Serve tubes, and a 24-element Schmidt superheater. They were fitted with Nord's variable exhaust. While they were delivered with vacuum brakes, they were all retro-fitted with Westinghouse air brakes, the compressor being sited on the left-hand side.

Thirty-five identical locomotives were built for the Nord-Belge, numbered 421 to 455. They passed to the SNCB as type 48, and were renumbered 4821 to 4855, and later renumbered again as 48.001 to 48.035. They had been built by John Cockerill et Cie between 1927 and 1931.

== Construction history ==
Construction of the locomotives was let out to various French manufacturers between 1912 and 1929.

Nord Nos.	SNCF Nos.	Manufacturer	Works Nos.	Year made	Notes
4.061 – 4.160	2-140.A.1 – 2-140.A.100	Société française de constructions mécaniques	3717–3816	1921	Ordered by the Ministry of Public Works in 1919.
4.161 – 4.170	2-140.A.101 – 2-140.A.110	Nord's La Chapelle Workshops	—	1913	
4.171 – 4.200	2-140.A.111 – 2-140.A.140	Société française de constructions mécaniques	3414–3443	1913	
4.201 – 4.240	2-140.A.141 – 2-140.A.180	Schneider et Cie.	3202–3241	1912–13	
4.241 – 4.260	2-140.A.181 – 2-140.A.200	Société des Batignolles	1862–1881	1912	
4.261 – 4.280	2-140.A.201 – 2-140.A.220	Schneider et Cie.	3242–3261	1913	
4.281 – 4.300	2-140.A.221 – 2-140.A.240	Société Franco-Belge	2028–2047	1912	
4.301 – 4.315	2-140.A.241 – 2-140.A.255	Société française de constructions mécaniques	4032–4046	1927	
4.316 – 4.330	2-140.A.256 – 2-140.A.270	Société Franco-Belge	2534–2548	1927	
4.331 – 4.340	2-140.A.271 – 2-140.A.280	Société Alsacienne de Constructions Mécaniques	7478–7487	1928	Graffenstaden Works

== Service history ==
They were allocated to various Nord depots, including La Chapelle. They were used in coal train service between Lens and Le Bourget. During World War I, they were also used on troop trains, and after the war they were also used on passenger trains.

Several locomotives were refitted with Lemaître exhausts; this increased the power output by 100 horsepower (75 kW) due to reduced back-pressure.

== Tenders ==
During the course of the service, they were coupled to several different types of tender:

- 17.A (3-axle) – the original tender with a capacity of 17,000 litres (3,700 imp gal; 4,500 US gal) of water and ?? tonnes of coal. This short tender allowed the use of 18-metre turntables until 1925.
- 19.A (3-axle) – 19,000 litres (4,200 imp gal; 5,000 US gal) of water and 4 tonnes (3.9 long tons; 4.4 short tons) of coal.
- 22.A were rebuilt from the tenders of Pershing 2-8-0s. They had a capacity of 22,000 litres (4,800 imp gal; 5,800 US gal) of water and ?? tonnes of coal.
- 24.A (bogie) were also ex rebuilt from Pershing 2-8-0 tenders – 24,000 litres (5,300 imp gal; 6,300 US gal) of water and ?? tonnes of coal.
- 31.A (bogie) were of Prussian origin, and had a capacity of 31,500 litres (6,900 imp gal; 8,300 US gal) of water and 7 tonnes (6.9 long tons; 7.7 short tons) of coal.
- 34.A (bogie) were former 31.A tenders modified to carry 34,000 litres (7,500 imp gal; 9,000 US gal) of water and ?? tonnes of coal.

There were also occasionally attached to other tender types such as the 15.A, 23.A, 32.P, 37.A (from withdrawn Nord Atlantics 2.641 to 2.675) and 38.A.

== Preservation ==
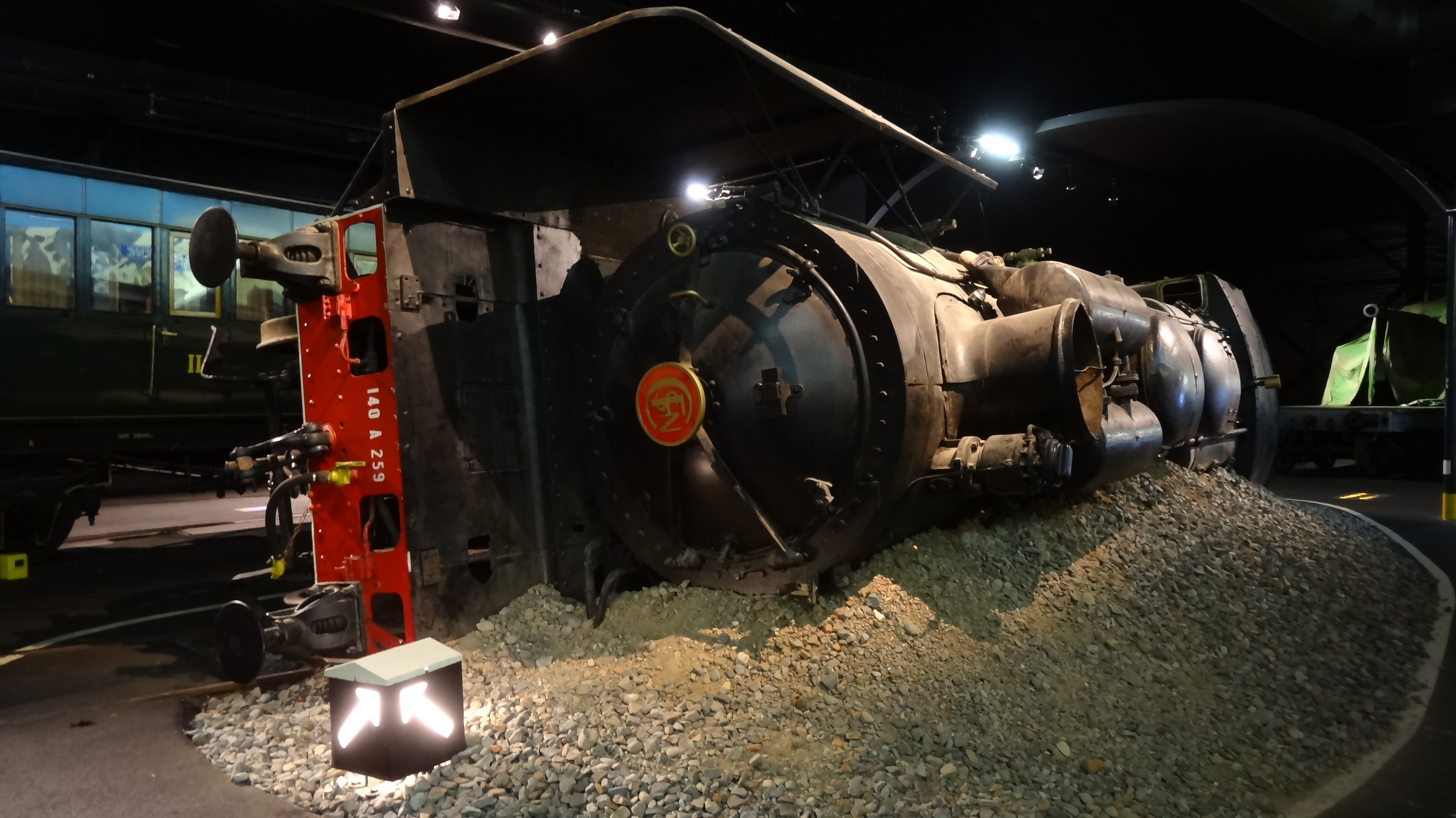
140.A.259 displayed on its side at the Cité du Train in Mulhouse

Only 140.A.259 has been preserved, without its tender; it is in the collection of the Cité du train in Mulhouse. It is displayed on its side to evoke the acts of sabotage performed by railwaymen at the time of the Resistance.

== Models ==
An HO scale etched brass and white metal kit of the Nord 4.061-series is available from the British manufacturer DJH Model Loco.

An HO scale kit of the SNCB type 48 has been offered by Belgian manufacturer Jocadis, based on the DJH kit.
