= Nord 3.606 to 3.787 =

Class of 182 French 0-6-0 locomotives

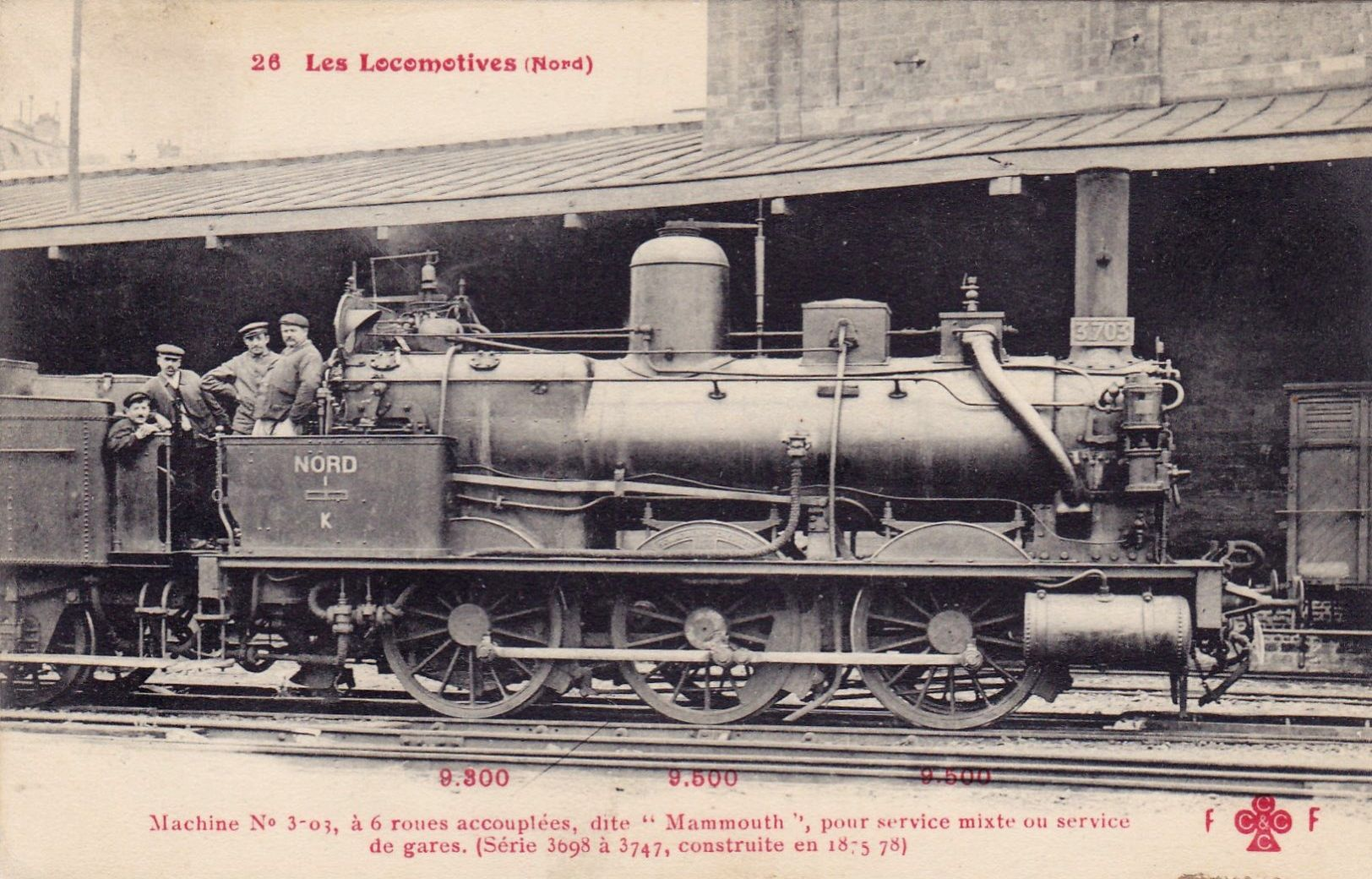
Type and origin
- Power type: Steam
- Build date: 1860–1882
- Total produced: 182
Specifications
- Configuration
  - Whyte: 0-6-0
  - UIC: C n2
- Gauge: 1,435 mm (4 ft 8 1/2 in)
- Driver dia.: 1,425 mm (4 ft 8 1/8 in)
- Wheelbase: 3.641–3.662: 3.32 m (10 ft 10 3/4 in); 3.663–3.697: 3.60 m (11 ft 9 3/4 in); 3.600/3.700: 3.60 m (11 ft 9 3/4 in)
- Length: 3.641–3.662: 7.9 m (25 ft 11 in); 3.663–3.697: 7.82 m (25 ft 8 in); 3.600/3.700: 8.07 m (26 ft 6 in)
- Loco weight: 3.641–3.662: 26.6 t (58,600 lb); 3.663–3.697: 27.2 t (60,000 lb); 3.600/3.700: 28–29 t (61,700–63,900 lb)
- Fuel type: Coal
- Firebox
  - Type: 3.641–3.697: Crampton; 3.600/3.700: Belpaire
  - Grate area: 3.641–3.697: 1.35 m^{2} (14.5 sq ft); 3.600/3.700: 1.63 m^{2} (17.5 sq ft)
- Boiler pressure: 3.641–3.697: 8.5 kg/cm^{2} (0.834 MPa; 121 psi); 3.600/3.700: 10 kg/cm^{2} (0.981 MPa; 142 psi)
- Heating surface: 3.641–3.662: 80.5 m^{2} (866 sq ft); 3.663–3.697: 83 m^{2} (890 sq ft); 3.600/3.700: 85 m^{2} (910 sq ft)
- Cylinders: Two, inside
- Cylinder size: 3.641–3.662: 380 mm × 610 mm (14 15/16 in × 24 in); 3.663–3.697: 400 mm × 610 mm (15 3/4 in × 24 in); 3.600/3.700: 400 mm × 610 mm (15 3/4 in × 24 in)
- Valve gear: Stephenson
Career
- Operators: Chemins de Fer du Nord
- Numbers: Nord: 3.606 – 3.787
- Nicknames: Mammouth

Nord 3.606 to 3.787 were 0-6-0 locomotives for mixed traffic of the Chemins de Fer du Nord. The machines were the continuation of the Nord 265 to 274 (3.265–3.274) Mammouth locomotives of 1849, and hence were also referred to by the same nickname. They were retired from service from 1910 until end of 1930.

== Construction history ==
The first series, Nord 3.621–3.660, dated back to 1860. Regarding the dimensions and disposition of the frame and drivetrain it was derived from the preceding Nord 265 to 274 Mammouth locomotives of 1849. Contrary to the 1849 type the machines were fitted with a Crampton-type boiler and firebox. The firebox extended over the rear driving axle and the boiler consisted of three shells. A Crampton steam regulator was mounted at the front and the steam pipes were routed down to the cylinders on the outside of the boiler. The two cylinders were mounted inside the frame in an inclined position and had a Stephenson valve gear. The machines weighed 26.6 t (58,600 lb) and had a tractive effort of 4,017 kg (8,860 lb). They were coupled with two-axle tenders, holding 7 m^{3} (247 cu ft) of water and 3 t (6,610 lb) of coal, and weighing 19 t (41,900 lb).

The type of 1861 had a boiler pressure of 8.5 kg/cm^{2} (0.834 MPa; 121 psi) and increased the maximum tractive effort of 5,254 kg (11,600 lb). The next type in 1861–1863 had an increased cylinder size of 380 mm × 610 mm (14 15/16 in × 24 in) which yielded another increase in tractive effort to 5,821 kg (12,800 lb).

The next series, Nord 3.663–3.697, was put into service in 1866–1867. It also had cylinders of 380 mm (14 15/16 in) and weighed 27 t (59,500 lb).

The machines of the next series, Nord 3.698–3.747, had an increased power output. They were built in 1875–1878 and had a Belpaire firebox and boiler with the dome on the rear boiler shell. The leaf spring of the rear axle suspension had been moved down below the firebox and the cylinder size increased to 400 mm (15 3/4 in)

The newer locomotives had an increased boiler pressure of 9 kg/cm^{2} (0.883 MPa; 128 psi), and on major overhauls also the older machines were brought to this standard.

The last series, built in 1882 and comprising Nord 3.606–3.620 and Nord 3.748–3.787, was built with vacuum brake and cab. The machines had a boiler pressure of 10 kg/cm^{2} (0.981 MPa; 142 psi) and a tractive effort of 6,849 kg (15,100 lb).

In 1880 four locomotives, Nord 3.621, 3.630, 3.634 and 3.639, were transformed to tank-locomotives for tram service.

Table of orders and numbers
Batch	Year	Quantity	Pre-1872 No.	Post-1872 No.	Manufacturer	Serial numbers	Notes
1	1860	20	340–359	3.640, 3.621–3.639	Graffenstaden	51–70	four rebuilt as tank engines in 1880
2	1861	10	541–550	3.641–3.650	Graffenstaden	95–104	Most retired by 1907
3	1862	12	651–662	3.651–3.662	Graffenstaden	219–230	Most retired by 1907
4	1866	7	663–669	3.663–3.669	Schneider et Cie	921–927	Most retired by 1907
4	1866	16	670–685	3.670–3.685	Schneider et Cie	954–969	Most retired by 1907
4	1867	12	686–697	3.686–3.697	Schneider et Cie	1015–1026	Most retired by 1907
5	1875	10	—	3.698–3.707	Schneider et Cie	1731–1740	
5	1875	10	—	3.708–3.717	Schneider et Cie	1771–1780	
5	1876	15	—	3.718–3.732	Schneider et Cie	1838–1852	
5	1878	15	—	3.733–3.747	Schneider et Cie	1907–1921	
6	1882	15	—	3.748–3.762	SACM-Mulhouse	3138–3152	
7	1882	10	—	3.763–3.772	Schneider et Cie	2112–2121	
7	1882	15	—	3.773–3.787	SACM-Mulhouse	3214–3228	
8	1882	8	—	3.606–3.613	SACM-Mulhouse	3230–3237	renumbered 3.683–3.690 in 1911
8	1883	7	—	3.614–3.620	SACM-Mulhouse	3238–3244	renumbered 3.691–3.697 in 1911

== Service history ==
The locomotives were used for mixed service on the main lines of the Chemins de Fer du Nord, as well as on less important lines, and later were used for local passenger trains, mixed service, freight trains and shunting. The last locomotives in service, the Nord 3.685, 3.714, 3.718, 3.732, 3.745 and 3.774, were removed from service with 30 December 1930.
