= Nord 2.451 to 2.631 =

Class of 181 French 0-4-2 locomotives

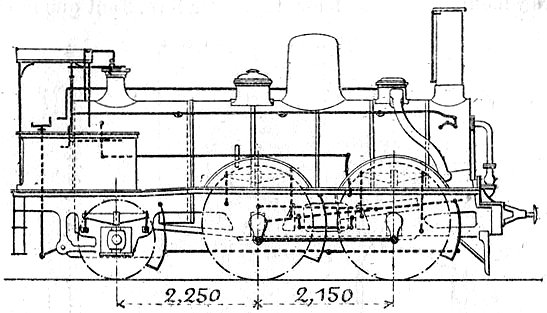
- Drawing of Nord 2.552 to 2.631
Type and origin
- Power type: Steam
- Build date: 1867–1883
- Total produced: 181
Specifications
- Configuration
  - Whyte: 0-4-2
  - UIC: B1 n2
- Gauge: 1,435 mm (4 ft 8 1/2 in)
- Driver dia.: 1,830 mm (6 ft 0 in)
- Wheelbase: 4.40 m (14 ft 5 1/4 in)
- Length: 8.18 m (26 ft 10 in)
- Adhesive weight: 23–24 t (50,700–52,900 lb)
- Loco weight: 31–32 t (68,300–70,500 lb)
- Fuel type: Coal
- Firebox
  - Type: Crampton
  - Grate area: 1.53–1.63 m^{2} (16.5–17.5 sq ft)
- Boiler pressure: 8.5–10 kg/cm^{2} (0.834–0.981 MPa; 121–142 psi)
- Heating surface: 93–134 m^{2} (1,000–1,440 sq ft)
- Cylinders: Two, inside
- Cylinder size: 420 mm × 560 mm (16 9/16 in × 22 1/16 in)
- Valve gear: Stephenson
Career
- Operators: Chemins de Fer du Nord
- Numbers: Nord: 2.451 – 2.631

Nord 2.451 to 2.631 were 0-4-2 locomotives for mixed traffic of the Chemins de Fer du Nord. The machines were retired from service from 1909 to 1923.

== Construction history ==
The locomotive design was first put into service at the Chemins de Fer du Nord in 1867 and originated from a similar design which was built by Ernest Goüin in 1851 for the Lyon railways and reproduced in large numbers by the Chemins de fer de l'Est, Chemins de fer de l'Ouest and Chemins de fer de Paris à Lyon et à la Méditerranée.

The main difference to these older types was the arrangement of the rear axle, which was supported from the outside in order to leave as much space as possible for the firebox between the wheels. The rest of the frame remained inside the driving wheels. The Stephenson valve gear and the cylinders were on the inside of the locomotive frame. The firebox was of the Crampton type, the boiler barrel consisted of three shells, with the middle one carrying the dome. A Crampton regulator sat behind the chimney, with the steam pipes running down on the outside to the steam chest. The boiler pressure was 8.5 kg/cm^{2} (0.834 MPa; 121 psi) on the first and 10 and 11 kg/cm^{2} (0.981 and 1.08 MPa; 142 and 156 psi) on the later machines, with the earlier series later also receiving boilers for 10 kg/cm^{2} (0.981 MPa; 142 psi).

The Nord 2.451 to 2.631 locomotives were built by Société J. F. Cail & Cie and Fives-Lille from 1867 to 1883.

Year	Qty.	Nord No.	Manufacturer
1867	36	2.451–2.486	Société J. F. Cail & Cie
1870–1875	65	2.487–2.551	Fives-Lille
1882–1883	54	2.552–2.605	Société J. F. Cail & Cie
1882–1883	26	2.606–2.631	Fives-Lille

The locomotives were coupled with 2 axle tenders, holding 7–8 m^{3} (247–283 cu ft) of water and 3 t (6,610 lb) of coal, and weighing 20–22 t (44,100–48,500 lb).
