= Nord 2.821 to 2.911 and 2.201 to 2.212 =

Class of French 2-4-0 and 4-4-0 locomotives

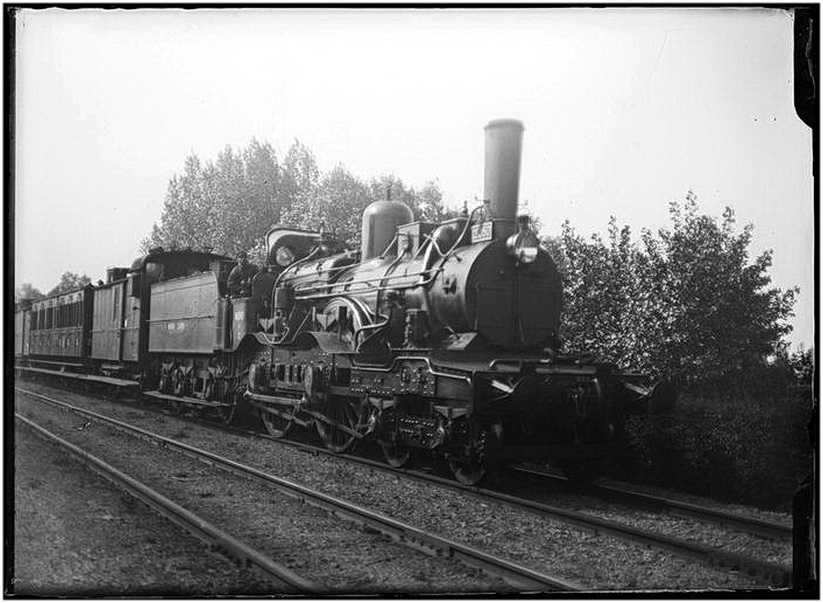
Type and origin
- Power type: Steam
- Build date: 1870–1885
- Total produced: 103
Specifications
- Configuration
  - Whyte: 2-4-0; 4-4-0
  - UIC: 2.821–2.860: 1B n2; 2.861–2.911: 2'B n2; 2.201–2.212: 1'B n2; all converted to 2'B n2
- Gauge: 1,435 mm (4 ft 8 1/2 in)
- Driver dia.: 2,100 mm (6 ft 10 5/8 in)
- Wheelbase: 2-4-0: 5.50 m (18 ft 1/2 in); 4-4-0: 6.32 m (20 ft 8 3/4 in)
- Length: 2.821–2.832: 8.46 m (27 ft 9 in); 2.833–2.860: 8.642 m (28 ft 4 1/4 in); 2.861–2.911: 9.31 m (30 ft 6 1/2 in)
- Fuel type: Coal
- Cylinders: Two, inside
- Cylinder size: 432 mm × 610 mm (17 in × 24 in)
- Valve gear: Stephenson
Career
- Operators: Chemins de Fer du Nord
- Numbers: Nord: 2.821 – 2.911, 2.201 – 2.212
- Nicknames: Outrance

The Nord 2.821 to 2.911 and 2.201 to 2.212, also referred to as Outrances, was a series of French 2-4-0 and 4-4-0 express passenger locomotives of the Chemins de Fer du Nord.

== Construction history ==
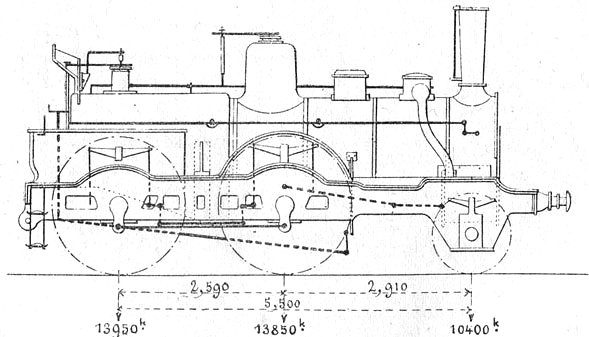
Nord 120 2.834 - 2.860.

The first series, Nord 2.821–2.832, designed by L. Beugniot as 2-4-0 locomotives, was built by André Koechlin & Cie in Mulhouse in 1870–1871. The locomotive had a double frame with two driving axles and a leading axle which had a clearance of 10 mm (0.39 in) on each side. The firebox had an arced top and sat between the two driving axles. The tubes had a length of 3.17 m (10.4 ft) and the boiler barrel consisted of two boiler shells, with a boiler pressure of 8.5 kg/cm^{2} (0.834 MPa; 121 psi). The dome was placed centrally on top of the firebox and a Crampton-type steam regulator was placed on the extreme front of the first boiler shell. The cylinders were installed horizontally without inclination inside of the frame and had a Stephenson valve gear. The two-axle tender used had a capacity of 8 m^{3} (280 cu ft) water and 3 t (6,610 lb) coal and weighed a total of 21.6 t (47,600 lb).

In 1873 Édouard Delebecque modified the design. A Belpaire firebox which extended over the rear driving axle was installed. The tubes were lengthened to 3.55 m (11.6 ft) and the dome was moved slightly forward to the front on top of the firebox. A single machine, the Nord 2.833, was built in 1873.

From 1875 to 1877 the next series, Nord 2.834–2.860, was built by the Société Alsacienne de Constructions Mécaniques (SACM) at Mulhouse with only minor differences. The dome was moved forward to the rear end of the second boiler shell, just in front of the firebox. Also a three-axle tender of 14 m^{3} (490 cu ft) water and 4 t (8,820 lb) coal, weighing 33 t (72,800 lb), was used.

In the following series, Nord 2.861–2.911, which was built in 1877–1879, the leading axle was replaced by a 2-axle bogie pivoting around a fixed point in the frame. Also the boiler pressure was increased to 10 kg/cm^{2} (0.981 MPa; 142 psi).

The last series was built in the years 1884 to 1885 and comprised the twelve locomotives Nord 2.201–2.212, which had a leading radial axle instead of the 2-axle bogie.

Over time various modifications were done on the machines. All machines with a single leading axle received leading 2-axle bogies with lateral movement, the Nord 2.821–2.833 in 1890–1892, the Nord 2.834–2.860 in 1894–1898 and the Nord 2.201–2.212 in 1891–1892. Additionally a Belpaire firebox was installed on most of the Nord 2.821–2.832 series, a spherical dome was mounted on top of the boiler barrel, and the boiler pressure was increased to 10–11 kg/cm^{2} (0.981–1.08 MPa; 142–156 psi).

In 1885–1890 the locomotives of the series Nord 2.833–2.860 also had their boiler pressure increased to 8.5–10 kg/cm^{2} (0.834–0.981 MPa; 121–142 psi) and Nord 2.847, 2.850 and 2.851 to 11 kg/cm^{2} (1.08 MPa; 156 psi). Some of the machines, called Outrances renforcées, also received cylinders with an increased size of 460 mm × 610 mm (18 1/8 in × 24 in).
