= Nord 4.2016 to 4.2095 =

Nord 4.2016 to 4.2095 SNCF 2-040.TG
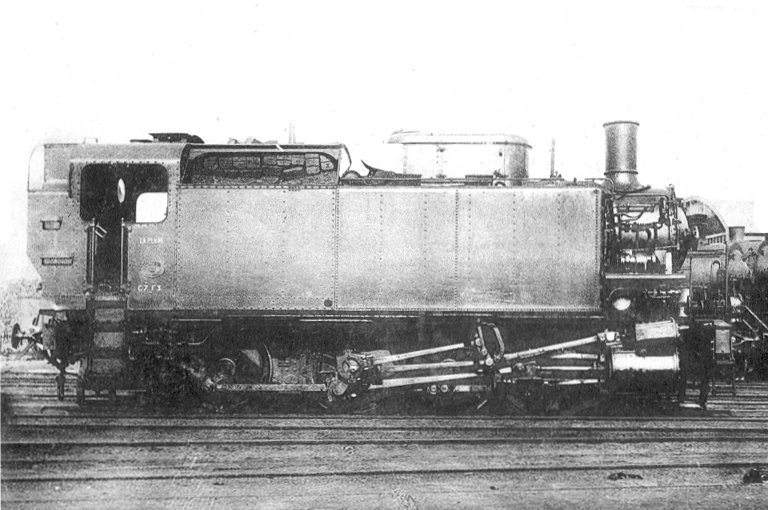
- Locomotive 4.029
Type and origin
- Power type: Steam
- Builder: ANF Blanc-Misseron (60); Corpet-Louvet (20)
- Build date: 1930–1933
- Total produced: 80
Specifications
- Configuration
  - Whyte: 0-8-0T
  - UIC: D n2t
- Gauge: 1,435 mm (4 ft 8 1/2 in)
- Driver dia.: 1,260 mm (49.61 in)
- Wheelbase: 4.45 m (14 ft 7 in)
- Length: 10.51 m (34 ft 6 in)
- Loco weight: 72.8 tonnes (71.7 long tons; 80.2 short tons)
- Fuel type: Coal
- Fuel capacity: 7.3 tonnes (7.2 long tons; 8.0 short tons)
- Water cap.: 9,750 litres (2,140 imp gal; 2,580 US gal)
- Firebox
  - Grate area: 2.30 m^{2} (24.8 sq ft)
- Boiler pressure: 12.0 kg/cm^{2} (1.18 MPa; 171 lbf/in^{2})
- Heating surface: 105.0 m^{2} (1,130 sq ft)
- Cylinders: Two, outside
- Cylinder size: 510 mm × 660 mm (20.08 in × 25.98 in)
- Valve gear: Gooch
- Loco brake: Westinghouse air
Performance figures
- Power output: 582 kW (780 hp)
- Tractive effort: 12,262 kgf (120.25 kN; 27,030 lbf)
Career
- Operators: Chemins de fer du Nord; SNCF
- Numbers: Nord: 4.2016 – 4.2095; SNCF 2-040.TG.1 – 80
- Nicknames: Big Julies
- Locale: Northern France
- Scrapped: 1960–67
- Disposition: All scrapped

Nord 4.2016 to 4.2095 were a class of 0-8-0T locomotives of the Chemin de fer du Nord.

== History ==
The eighty locomotives were built from 1930 until 1933, and were used for shunting in yards and depots. The Nord numbered them 4.2016 to 4.2095; in 1938 they passed to the SNCF who renumbered them 2–040.TG.1 to 2–040.TG.80.

They were all scrapped between 1960 and 1967.

Table of orders
Nord Nos.	SNCF Nos.	Quantity	Manufacturer	Serial Nos.	Year	Notes
4.2016 – 4.2035	2–040.TG.1 – 20	20	ANF, Blanc-Missereon	278–297	1930	
4.2036 – 4.2045	2–040.TG.21 – 30	10	Corpet-Louvet	1762–1771	1930	
4.2046 – 4.2065	2–040.TG.31 – 50	20	ANF, Blanc-Missereon	311–330	1930	
4.2066 – 4.2075	2–040.TG.51 – 60	10	ANF, Blanc-Missereon	381–390	1931	
4.2076 – 4.2085	2–040.TG.61 – 70	10	Corpet-Louvet	1793–1802	1931–32	
4.2086 – 4.2095	2–040.TG.71 – 80	10	ANF, Blanc-Missereon	392–401	1933	
