= Nord 4.001 to 4.075 and 4.636 to 4.990 =

Class of French 0-8-0 locomotives

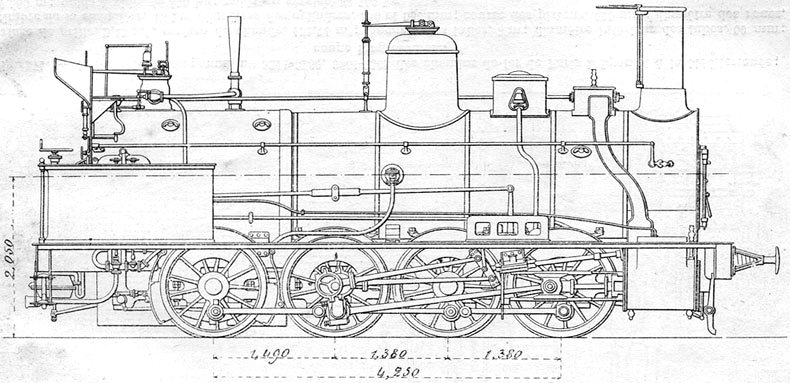
Type and origin
- Power type: Steam
- Build date: 1866–1891
Specifications
- Configuration
  - Whyte: 0-8-0
  - UIC: D n2
- Gauge: 1,435 mm (4 ft 8 1/2 in)
- Driver dia.: 1,300 mm (4 ft 3 1/8 in)
- Wheelbase: 4.25 m (13 ft 11 1/4 in)
- Length: 8.115 m (26 ft 7 1/2 in)
- Adhesive weight: 44.2 t (97,444 lb)
- Loco weight: 43.4 t (95,681 lb)
- Fuel type: Coal
- Firebox
  - Type: Crampton; Belpaire
  - Grate area: 4.801 – 4.950: 2.23 m^{2} (24.0 sq ft); 4.951 – 4.990: 2.10 m^{2} (22.6 sq ft)
- Boiler pressure: 8.5–10 kg/cm^{2} (0.834–0.981 MPa; 121–142 psi)
- Heating surface: 4.801 – 4.950: 125 / 141 m^{2} (1,350 / 1,520 sq ft); 4.951 – 4.990: 125 / 145 m^{2} (1,350 / 1,560 sq ft)
- Cylinders: Two, outside
- Cylinder size: 500 mm or 550 mm × 650 mm (19 11/16 in or 21 5/8 in × 25 9/16 in)
- Valve gear: Stephenson
Career
- Operators: Chemins de Fer du Nord
- Numbers: Nord: 4.001 – 4.075, 4.636 – 4.990
- Nicknames: 180 unités
- Preserved: One: Nord 4.853

Nord 4.001 to 4.075 and 4.636 to 4.990, also called 180 unités, were 0-8-0 locomotives for freight traffic of the Chemins de Fer du Nord.

== Construction history ==
The locomotives were built in several batches by various manufacturers. Starting with 1879 a Belpaire firebox was installed in the newly built machines, and beginning with 1890 the locomotives were equipped with a cab.

Date built	Qty.	Nord Numbers	Manufacturer	Serial number	Notes
1866	10	4.821 – 4.830	Schneider - Le Creusot	980–989	
1866	10	4.831 – 4.840	Schneider - Le Creusot	1000–1009	
1867	10	4.841 – 4.850	Schneider - Le Creusot	1027–1036	
1866	24	4.851 – 4.874	Société J. F. Cail & Cie	1494–1517	
1872	10	4.801 – 4.810	Schneider - Le Creusot	1500–1507, 1518–1519	
1870–1871	10	4.811 – 4.820	Schneider - Le Creusot	1398–1405, 1419–1420	
1871	5	4.875 – 4.879	Schneider - Le Creusot	1421–1425	
1872	20	4.880 – 4.899	Schneider - Le Creusot	1469–1478, 1480–1489	
1872–1873	10	4.900 – 4.909	Schneider - Le Creusot	1520–1527, 1533–1534	
1872–1873	8	4.910 – 4.917	John Cockerill & Cie	800–807	
1873	17	4.918 – 4.935	Schneider - Le Creusot	1535–1542, 1564–1573	
1872–1873	15	4.936 – 4.950	Claparède	46–60	
1874	20	4.951 – 4.970	Schneider - Le Creusot	1639–1658	
1879–1880	20	4.971 – 4.990	Schneider - Le Creusot	1961–1966, 1971–1976, 1985–1992	
1881–1882	20	4.636 – 4.655	Société de Construction des Batignolles	995–1014	
1881	30	4.656 – 4.685	Claparède & Cie.	167–196	
1882	30	4.686 – 4.715	Fives-Lille	2380–2409	
1881	30	4.716 – 4.745	Fives-Lille	2350–2379	
1880	15	4.746 – 4.760	Fives-Lille	2290–2304	
1880	10	4.761 – 4.770	Fives-Lille	2318–2327	
1880	20	4.771 – 4.790	Schneider - Le Creusot	2021–2030, 2033–2042	
1881	10	4.791 – 4.800	Schneider - Le Creusot	2049–2058	
1881	25	4.001 – 4.025	Lokomotivfabrik Floridsdorf	318–342	
1881	20	4.026 – 4.045	Wiener Neustädter Lokomotivfabrik	2494–2513	
1890	15	4.046 – 4.075	Anciens Établissements Cail	2312–2336	
1890	15	4.046 – 4.075	Société de Construction des Batignolles	1205–1219	

In 1921 the remaining machines were renumbered as follows:

- 4.001 – 4.075 became 4.601 – 4.674 (4.005 was written off in 1908)
- 4.636 – 4.800 became 4.702 – 4.853
- 4.801 – 4.850 became 4.856 – 4.878
- 4.881 – 4.919 became 4.881 – 4.930
- 4.954 – 4.990 became 4.931 – 4.954
