= 0-4-6T =

Engerth locomotive wheel arrangement

An 0-4-6T, in the Whyte notation for the classification of steam locomotives by wheel arrangement, is a locomotive with no leading wheels, four driving wheels fixed in a rigid frame, and six trailing wheels (normally mounted in a trailing truck). Examples of this type of locomotive were built by Wilhelm von Engerth.

== Equivalent classifications ==
Other equivalent classifications are:

- UIC classification: B3 (also known as German classification and Italian classification)
- French classification: 023

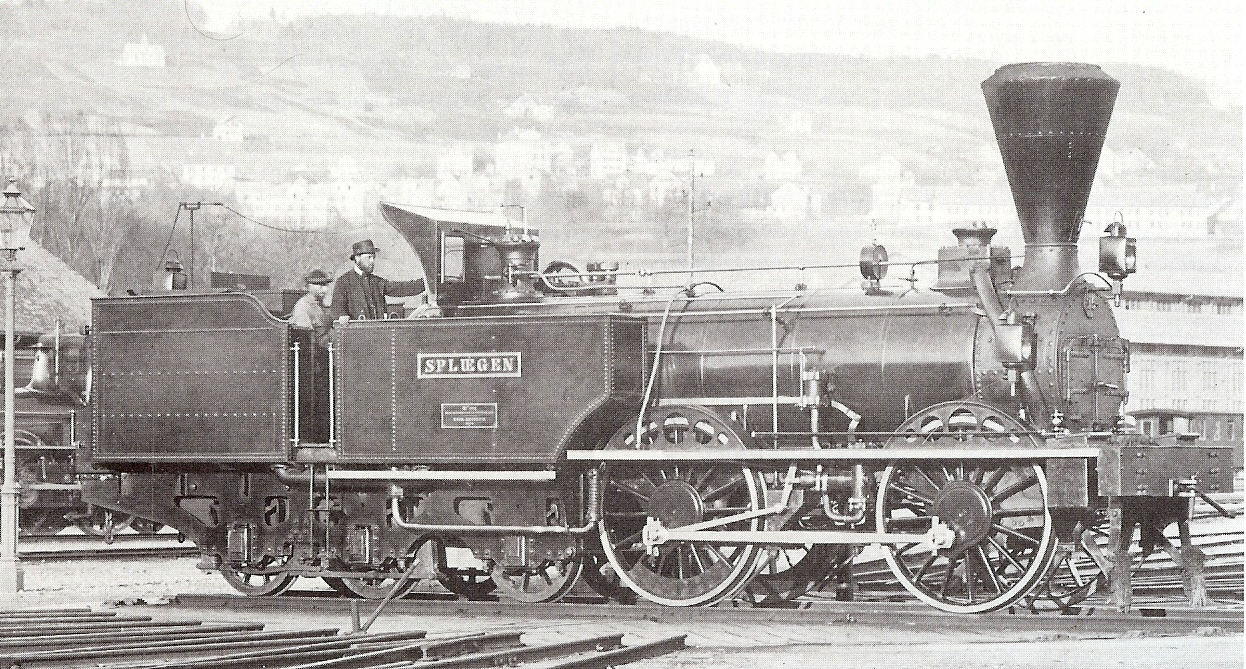
Engerth locomotive "Spluegen" Number 25 of the VSB at Zürich

== History ==
This wheel arrangement was used on Engerth articulated steam locomotives, widely used on Alpine railways. One early example was Genf built by Maschinenfabrik Esslingen in 1858 for the Swiss Central Railway.
