= Engerth locomotive =

Articulated locomotive type

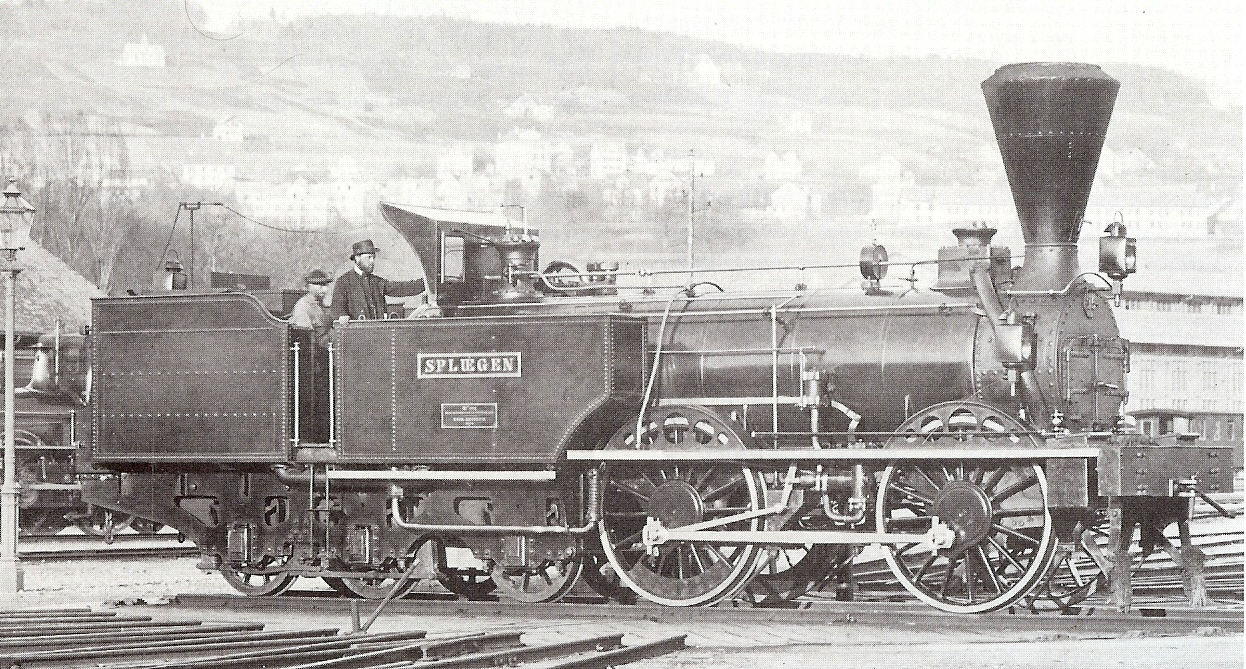
An Engerth locomotive

The Engerth locomotive was a type of early articulated steam locomotive designed by Wilhelm Freiherr von Engerth for use on the Semmering Railway in Austria. The distinctive feature of the Engerth design was an articulated tender as part of the main locomotive frame. Some of the weight of the tender therefore rested on the driving wheels, improving adhesion, while articulation allowed the locomotive to navigate the narrow curves of mountain railways.

== Designer ==
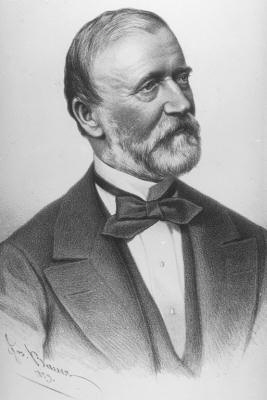
Wilhelm von Engerth

Wilhelm Engerth was born in Pless, Upper Silesia (Now Pszczyna, Poland) on 26 May 1814, the brother of the artist Edouard von Engerth. Initially, he studied architecture, but in 1834 he took up mechanical engineering as a profession. By the late 1850s he was the General Manager of the Imperial Austrian State Railways. Engerth was created a Baron (Freiherr) in 1875, and he died on 4 September 1884 in Leesdorf.

== History ==
Von Engerth first patented his design for an articulated locomotive on 11 December 1852.

=== Semmering ===
The Semmering Railway, opened on 17 July 1854, was one of the first true mountain railways, traversing a section of the Austrian Alps. It was characterized by steep gradients and sharp curves. To work this railway a new design of locomotive was developed.

2004 Austrian 25 Euro commemorative coin

A competition was held to decide which locomotives would be bought for operation on the Semmering Railway. One stretch of the line had gradients of 1 in 40 (2.5%) and curves with a minimum radius of 190 metres (210 yd) and a maximum radius of 285 metres (312 yd). A speed of 11.5 kilometres per hour (7.1 mph) was required to be maintained and a maximum axle loading of 14 tonnes, with a boiler pressure not exceeding 8.5 kgf/cm^{2} (830 kPa). There were four entrants, Bavaria, built by Maffei; Wiener-Neustadt built by Wiener-Neustadt; Seraing built by Société anonyme John Cockerill in Belgium and Vindobona built by the Gloggnitz Bahn in Vienna. All four locomotives met the trial conditions, but none proved reliable in practical use. The Semmering Trials led to a number of developments in locomotive design: Fairlie's Patent of 1863, The Meyer locomotive and the Mallet locomotive.

The Engerth design articulated the tender with the main locomotive frame, allowing some of the weight of the fuel and water to be carried on the driving wheels to improve adhesion. Because the tender was articulated, rather than directly attached to the frame, the locomotive could traverse relatively sharp curves, while still enjoying the advantage of the additional adhesive weight gain. The original design also included an indirect drive from the main driving wheels to the wheels under the tender. This arrangement proved too complex to maintain and was dropped from the design.

Sixteen locomotives were supplied to the Semmering Railway between November 1853 and May 1854. They proved capable of 19 kilometres per hour (12 mph) uphill on gradients of 1 in 40 (2.5%). An Engerth locomotive was featured on an Austrian stamp commemorating the 150th anniversary of the Semmering Railway in 2004. The Engerth locomotive also appeared on a 25 Euro coin issued by Austria in 2004.

=== Other Engerth locomotives ===
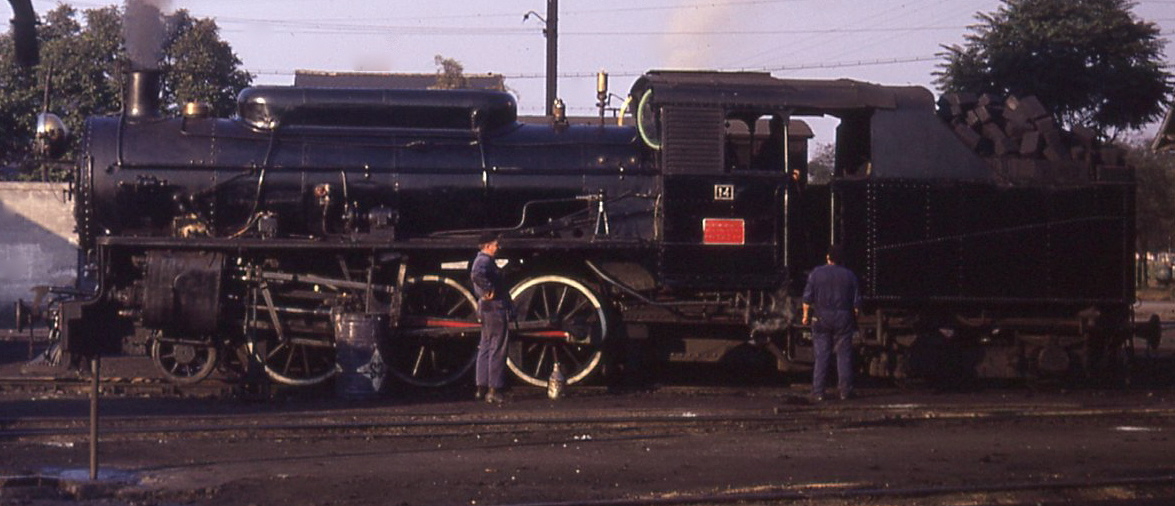
PV 2-6+4 No. 14 at Ponferrada, August 1970

The design proved popular, especially for use in Alpine mountain railways. Engerth locomotives were found with wheel arrangements of 0-4-4T, 0-4-6T, 2-6-4T, 0-6-4T, and 0-8-6T. As well as in Austria, they were used in Bosnia and Herzegovina, France, Italy, Java, Romania, Spain and Switzerland. Krauss of Munich built ten locomotive for the Ponferrada - Villablino Railway (PV) in Spain. Some narrow gauge 2-6-0T locomotives were built for the Elgoibar - San Sebastián Railway. These powerful locomotives were capable of 60 kilometres per hour (37 mph) and could traverse curves of 100 metres (110 yd) radius. Two of these locomotives were later sold to the PV. Another four locomotives built by MACOSA in Spain were also bought by the PV. Three of the PV locomotives were in service until 1989. Thirteen Engerth locomotives were supplied to the Oraviţa - Bazias Railway in Romania in 1854.

=== Fink variation ===
A variation of the Engerth system was devised by Pius Fink. This entailed having the rear wheels also driven by coupling rods from a crankshaft, thus making the locomotive an 0-6-4-0T. One locomotive was built by the Staatseisenbahn Gesellschaft, Vienna in 1861 carried No. 500 and was named Steyerdorf. It was used on the Reschitza - Orawicza line. Three more were built, the last in 1867. These included No. 501 Krassova and No. 502 Gerliste. One of these four locomotives survived until 1891, becoming Hungarian State Railways No.4270.

== Preservation ==
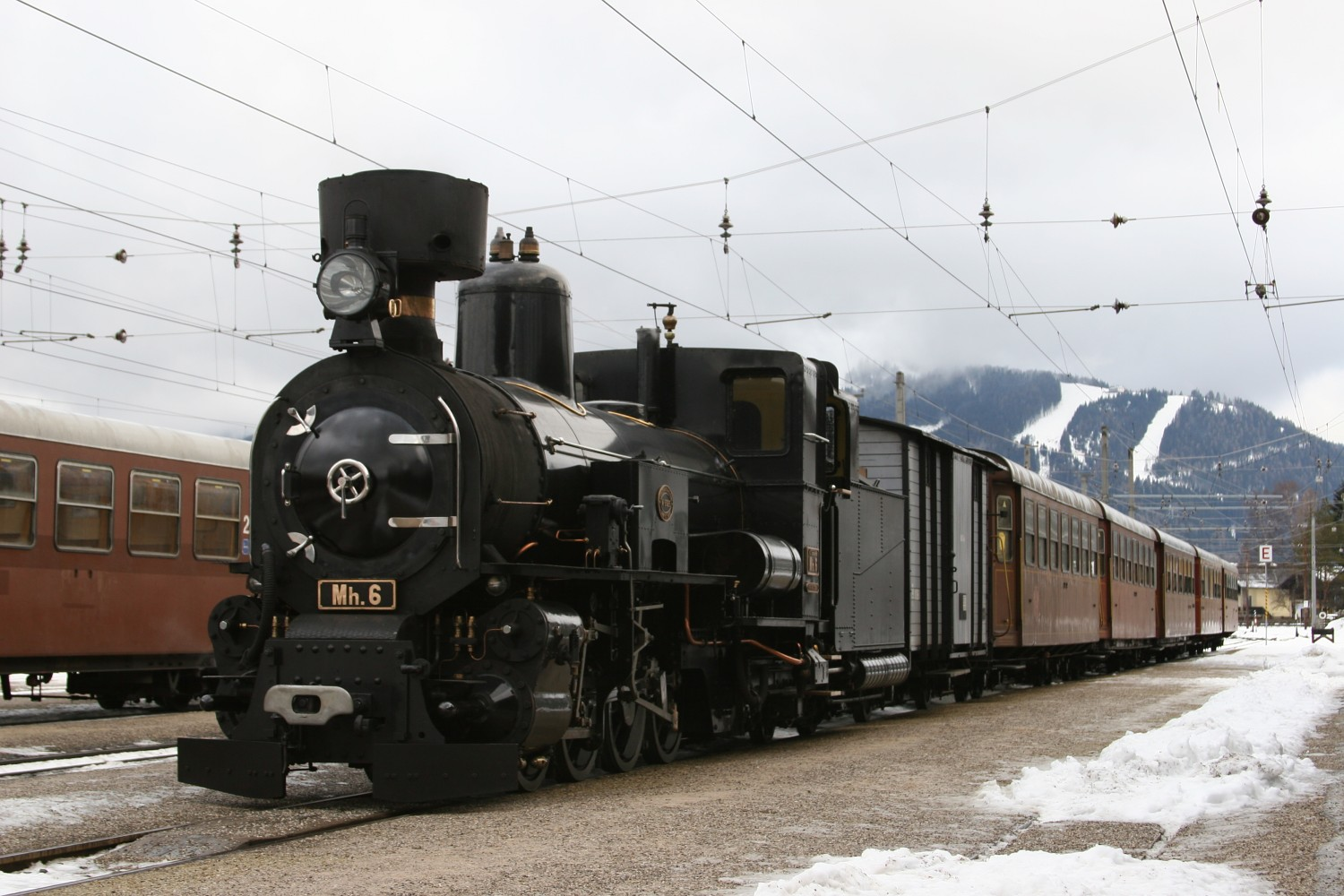
Engerth locomotive Mh6 on the Mariazellerbahn

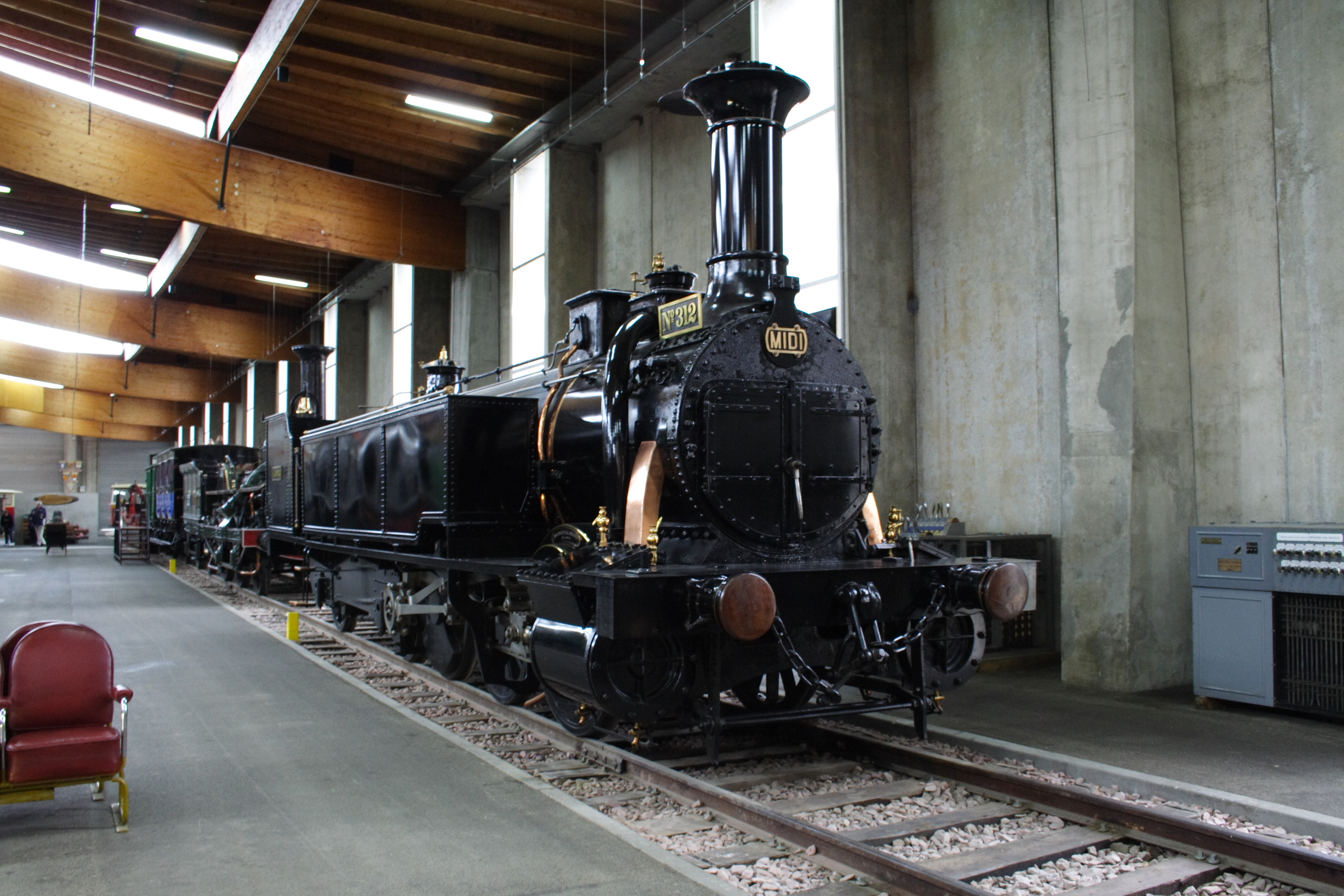
CF du Midi No.312 L'Adour

One example of the Engerth type is preserved at the Swiss Transport Museum in Lucerne. This locomotive, No.28 Genf an 0-4-6T built by Maschinenfabrik Esslingen in 1858 to work the Schweizerische Centraalbahn (Swiss Central Railway). She retired from active service in 1899 and was used as a static boiler at Olten. She is the oldest locomotive in Switzerland.

Buštěhradská dráha (Buštěhrad Railway) locomotive 103 Kladno is preserved in the National Technical Museum in Prague, Czech Republic.

All six of the narrow gauge NÖLB Mh or 399 class Engerth locomotives survive in Austria. These 760 mm (2 ft 5 15/16 in) gauge 0-8+4 (D2h2t) locomotives were built by Krauss for the Mariazellerbahn in 1906 and 1908. When the Mariazellerbahn was electrified the Niederosterreichische Landesbahn (NOLB) transferred them to their Waldviertler Schmalspurbahnen system at Gmund. When the ÖBB took over in 1922 the locomotives were redesignated the 399 class.

Mh1 / 399.01 (5431/1906) is currently based at Gmünd.

Mh2 / 399.02 (5432/1906).

Mh3 / 399.03 (5433/1906) was sold to the Pinzgauer Lokalbahn. It is currently based at Zell am See.

Mh4 / 399.04 (5434/1906) is based at Gmünd.

Mh5 / 399.05 (5924/1908) is privately owned.

Mh6 / 399.06 (5925/1908) is preserved on the Mariazellerbahn in Austria.

Chemins de fer du Midi 0-6-4T locomotive no.312 L'Adour is preserved at the Musée Français du Chemin de Fer, Mulhouse, France.

=== Reproduction ===
The Beer Heights Light Railway has Gem, an Engerth type locomotive on its 7 1/4 in (184 mm) gauge line.
