= Nord 3.1201 to 3.1290 =

Nord 3.1201 to 3.1290 “Superpacific”
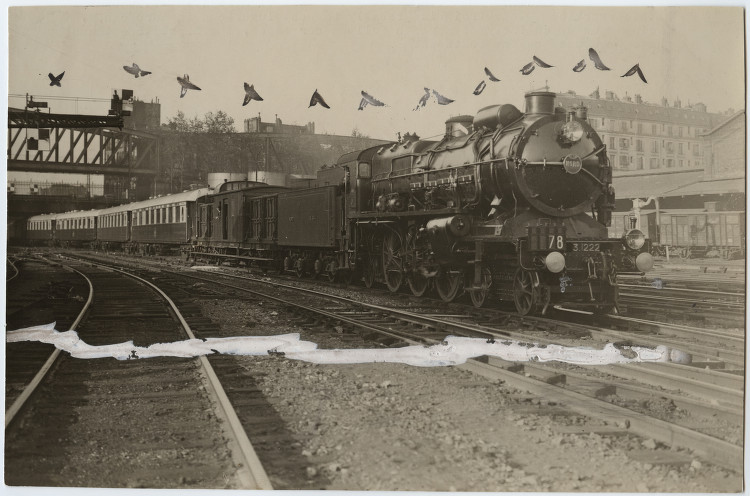
- Nord 3.1222 brings the up Flèche d’Or (Golden Arrow) into Paris Gare du Nord
Type and origin
- Power type: Steam
- Builder: ANF; SFCM
- Serial number: ANF: 138–177, 263–272; SFCM: 4113–4152
- Build date: 1923–1931
- Total produced: 90
Specifications
- Configuration
  - Whyte: 4-6-2
  - UIC: 2′C1′ h4v
- Gauge: 1,435 mm (4 ft 8 1/2 in)
- Driver dia.: 1,900 mm (6 ft 2.80 in)
- Fuel type: Coal
- Fuel capacity: 8 t (17,600 lb)
- Water cap.: 37,000 L (8,100 imp gal; 9,800 US gal)
- Boiler pressure: 17 kg/cm^{2} (1.67 MPa; 242 psi)
- Cylinders: Four (Compound: 2 HP inside, 2 LP outside)
- High-pressure cylinder: 440 mm × 660 mm (17.32 in × 25.98 in)
- Low-pressure cylinder: 620 mm × 690 mm (24.41 in × 27.17 in)
Performance figures
- Power output: 2,800 hp (2,090 kW)
- Tractive effort: 201.26 kN (45,250 lbf)
Career
- Operators: Nord; → SNCF
- Numbers: Nord: 3.1201 – 3.1290; SNCF: 231.C.1 to 231.C.88, 231.D.1, 231.D.2

Nord 3.1201 to 3.1290 was a class of 90 Pacific (4-6-2) type steam locomotive of the Chemins de Fer du Nord. They served in the north of France and Belgium. The first batch were built in 1923, and last remaining were retired from service in the 1960s. These locomotives were widely known as "Superpacifics" due to their high performance, which made them famous even in Britain.

== Background ==
The Chemins de Fer du Nord had need of a locomotive able to travel from Paris to Lille, pulling a 300-ton passenger train at 120 km/h (75 mph). The locomotive therefore needed a tender able to hold 37 m^{3} of water and 8 tons of coal.

== Design ==
In 1923, during the tenure of Louis Breville (1918–1928), Marc de Caso designed the four cylinder compound pacific locomotive, with superheating, and a narrow firebox 3 m long. capable of output of 2,700 hp (2,000 kW). The appearance was due to Gaston Schaeffer who grouped all the outside pipes together and ran them along the boiler. Their boilers were superb, which is the reason why André Chapelon later based some of his locomotive boilers on this design.

The locomotives were not equipped with mechanical stokers which made the job of the fireman harder as he had to throw the coal uniformly throughout the firebox. The cab was not enclosed, a characteristic found throughout the Chemins de Fer du Nord, and drivers gave it the nickname rendez-vous des courants d'air. The Nord specification tender was built to such a quality that the SNCF used the same design for its own tender locomotives twenty years later.

== Construction history ==
The locomotives were built in three batches:—

Table of orders
Year	Manufacturer	Serial numbers	Nord nos.	SNCF nos.	Notes
1923–24	ANF	138–177	3.1201–3.1240	231.C.1 – 40	
1929	ANF	263–272	3.1241–3.1250	231.C.41 – 48, 231.D.1 - 2	
1930–31	SFCM	4113–4152	3.1251–3.1290	231.C.49 – 88	

Two locomotives, 3.1249 and 3.1250 were rebuilt by Nord's La Chapelle Works in 1934 as 2-cylinder simple locomotives. They were used in the Superpacific locomotive pool, but were withdrawn in 1945.

== Numbering and livery ==
The class was numbered 3.1201 to 3.1290 before the nationalisation of the Chemins de Fer du Nord in 1938, and were the most prestigious locomotives of the company. They were painted in a dark brown livery with cream lining. The SNCF renumbered the rebuilt simple locomotives 231.D.1 and 231.D.2; while the others were renumbered 231.C.1 to 231.C.88

== Career ==
The Superpacifics performed well for many years and were only surpassed by André Chapelon's 231 Pacific locomotive, copied from the 231 D Ouest engines of the Chemins de Fer de l'État. The last few examples were withdrawn from service during the 1960s. Chapelon often said that the only modification he had made to the design was the fitting of a Kylchap blastpipe, thus enhancing smoke ejection. (The Kylchap was named so due to the names of its creators, Kylälä and Chapelon.)

The engine is also famous due to a 1:87 HO railway model reproduced made by Jouef in the 1960s.

== Notes ==
- Davies, John (January 1997). Chemins de fer du Nord Locomotive List 1842–1938. Sunnybank, Queensland: Dr. John Davies. ISBN 0-646-30938-2.
- Hollingsworth, John Brian (1982). The Illustrated Encyclopedia of the World's Steam Passenger Locomotives: A technical directory of major international express train engines from the 1820s to the present day. New York: Crescent Books. ISBN 978-0-517-37486-3.
- Kalla-Bishop, Peter M. (1985). Steam locomotives (translated and adapted from the Italian of Greggio, Luciano, Le Locomotive a vapore). New York: Crescent Books. ISBN 978-0-517-48366-4.
