= Cité du Train =

Railway museum in Mulhouse, France

- Cité du Train
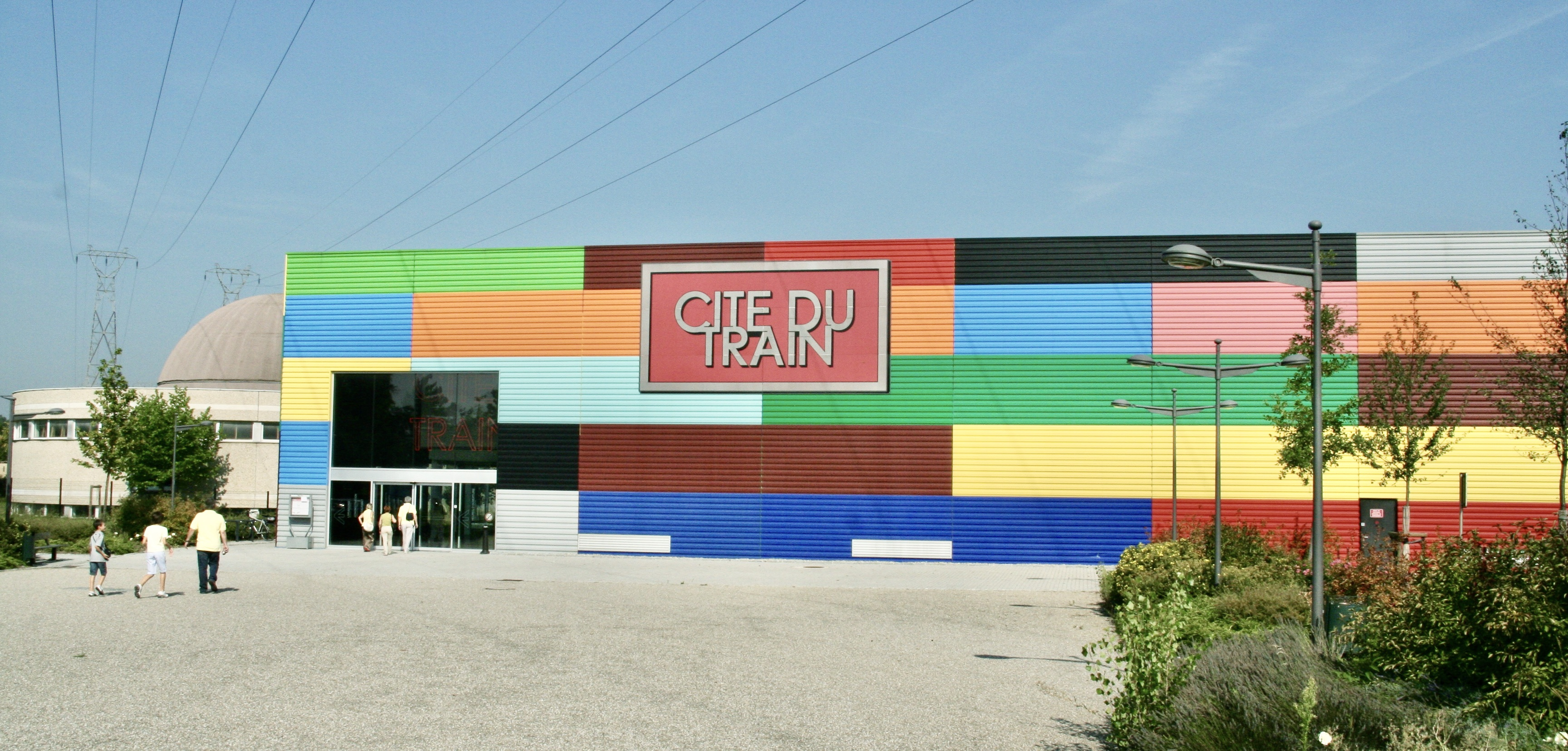
- Entrance of the museum
- Coordinates: 47°45′02″N 7°17′38″E
- Website: www.citedutrain.com

The Cité du Train (English: City of the Train or Train City), situated in Mulhouse, France, is one of the ten largest railway museums in the world. It is the successor to the Musée Français du Chemin de Fer (French National Railway Museum), the organisation responsible for the conservation of major historical SNCF railway equipment.

== History ==
In 1961, Mulhouse City Council offered land in Dornach to allow the SNCF to present their historical rolling stock, representative of the company's history. In 1971, the first locomotives were provisionally placed in the old engine shed, Mulhouse-Nord. A second site nearby was opened to the public in 1983 at which stage the museum received 240,000 visitors a year.

As attendance declined, it was decided to transfer the collection to the group Culture Espaces, which was already in charge of the Cité de l'automobile (French national automobile museum) since 1999. The French national, regional and departmental governments, as well as the City of Mulhouse, financed a renovation at a total cost of 8.6 million euros.

The architect François Seigneur designed an exhibition display named Le siècle d'or du chemin de fer (The golden century of railway), tracing historical events from 1860 to 1940, in a new hall nearly 6,000 square metres with 25 additional exhibits, bringing the total number in the museum to 103. In semi-darkness, the visitor may discover several sections of similar technology in display cabinets, with mannequins that light up as the visitor approaches, including poorer and richer aspects of railway life.

In the old renovated building, the emphasis is mostly placed on the instructional aspect of technology, explaining the mechanisms powering steam, diesel and electric locomotives and their development. It is possible to go inside a locomotive to admire its inner workings. Between the two buildings is an outdoor court complete with a restaurant which railway elements throughout as well as a themed rooms to complete the experience.

In the 2020s, the museum covers a floor area of 60,000 m^{2} (650,000 sq ft), which includes an exhibition space of 35,000 m^{2} (380,000 sq ft), making it one of the largest museums in the world.
