= 0-6-2+2-6-0T =

Locomotive wheel arrangement

A 0-6-2+2-6-0, in the Whyte notation for the classification of steam locomotives by wheel arrangement, is an articulated locomotive with two separate engine units with no leading wheels, six powered and coupled driving wheels on three axles, and two trailing wheels. The only examples were forms of the Meyer articulated locomotive.

Other equivalent classifications are:

- UIC classification: (C1')(1'C)t (also known as German classification and Italian classification)
- French classification: 031+130
- Turkish classification: 34+34
- Swiss classification: 3/4+3/4 up to the early 1920s, later 6/8

It is best known for its use in the French du Bousquet locomotives by Gaston du Bousquet.

The wheel arrangement was used by the Ferrocarril de Antofagasta a Bolivia in Chile, and by the Chemin de Fer du Nord in France.
