= Ceinture 51 to 65 =

Ceinture 51 – 65 Nord 3.701 – 3.715 SNCF 2-230.TA SNCF 2-231.TA
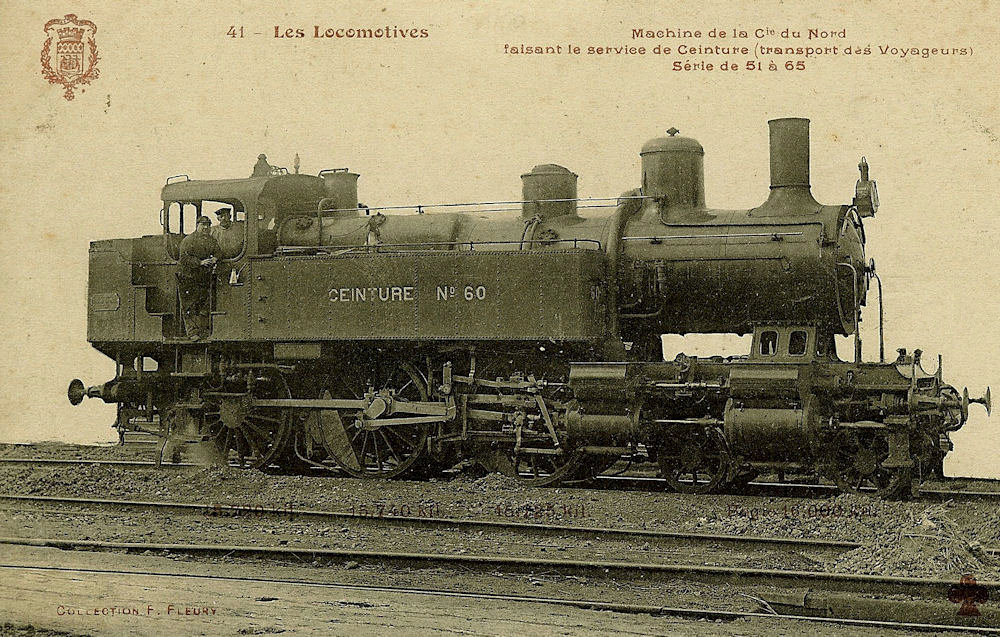
- Ceinture No. 60
Type and origin
- Power type: Steam
- Designer: Gaston du Bousquet
- Builder: Hellemmes Works; La Chapelle Works
- Build date: 1902–1903
- Total produced: 15
Specifications
- Configuration
  - Whyte: 4-6-0T
  - UIC: 2′C n4vt
- Gauge: 1,435 mm (4 ft 8 1/2 in)
- Driver dia.: 1,600 mm (5 ft 3 in)
- Length: 11.445 m (37 ft 6 1/2 in)
- Width: 2.810 m (9 ft 2 3/4 in)
- Height: 4.220 m (13 ft 10 1/4 in)
- Frame type: Plate frame
- Adhesive weight: 47.2 tonnes (46.5 long tons; 52.0 short tons)
- Loco weight: 63.2 tonnes (62.2 long tons; 69.7 short tons)
- Fuel type: Coal
- Fuel capacity: 3 tonnes (3.0 long tons; 3.3 short tons)
- Water cap.: 5,000 litres (1,100 imp gal; 1,300 US gal)
- Firebox
  - Type: Belpaire
  - Grate area: 2.35 m^{2} (25.3 sq ft)
- Boiler
  - Pitch: 2.5 m (8 ft 2 1/2 in)
  - Diameter: 1.316 m (4 ft 3 3/4 in)
  - Tube plates: 3.5 m (11 ft 5 3/4 in)
  - Small tubes: 90, 70 mm (2 3/4 in)
- Boiler pressure: 16 kg/cm^{2} (1.57 MPa; 228 psi)
- Heating surface
  - Firebox: 10.09 m^{2} (108.6 sq ft)
  - Tubes: 129.71 m^{2} (1,396.2 sq ft)
  - Total surface: 139.8 m^{2} (1,505 sq ft)
- Cylinders: Four, tandem compound
- High-pressure cylinder: 330 by 600 millimetres (13 in × 23 5/8 in)
- Low-pressure cylinder: 540 by 600 millimetres (21 1/4 in × 23 5/8 in)
- Valve gear: Walschaerts
- Valve type: Slide valves
- Train brakes: Westinghouse airbrake
- Safety systems: automatic whistle
- Couplers: Buffer and chain couplers
Performance figures
- Maximum speed: 80 km/h (50 mph)
- Power output: 1,021 CV (751 kW; 1,007 hp)
- Tractive effort: 10.205t
Career
- Operators: Ceinture; Nord; CGL; SNCF
- Numbers: Ceinture: 51 – 65; Nord. 3.701 – 3.715; SNCF 2-230.TA.1 – 2-232.TA.6; SNCF 2-231.TA.1
- Scrapped: 1936–1960
- Disposition: All scrapped

Ceinture 51 to 65 were a class of fifteen 4-6-0T locomotives built in 1902 for the Syndicat d'Exploitation des Chemins de fer de Ceinture de Paris. They passed to the Chemins de fer du Nord in 1934 who renumbered them Nord 3.701 to 3.715. In 1938 they passed to the SNCF who renumbered them 230.TA.1 to 230.TA.6.

== History ==
The chief mechanical engineer of the Nord Gaston du Bousquet designed a series of fifteen push-pull tank locomotives for the Ceinture that were capable of rapid acceleration due to the frequent stops. The first batch of locomotives were built by the Nord's Hellemmes workshops; they were followed by a second batch built by the Nord's La Chapelle workshops. They entered service on the 1 April 1903.

In 1934 at the dissolution of the Syndicat, the Nord renumbered them 3.701 to 3.715.

In 1936, the Nord rebuilt 3.702 (ex Ceinture 52) with a larger rear bunker and a trailing axle, making it a 4-6-2T. The Nord did not renumber it, as their numbering system only encoded the number of driving axles. The SNCF initially failed to notice that the locomotive was different from its sisters, and initially renumbered it 230.TA.1; when the error was spotted it was renumbered 231.TA.1.

Also in 1936 four locomotives were scrapped, and two were sold the Compagnie générale de voies ferrées d'intérêt local (GCL). Three more were sold the following year leaving just six to enter service with the SNCF in 1938; however two of these were sold in April 1939 without receiving their SNCF number. The remaining four were scrapped between 1939 and 1947.

The CGL used their locomotives on the Chemin de fer d'Achiet à Bapaume and Chemin de fer de Vélu-Bertincourt à Saint-Quentin lines. The last CGL locomotive to be scrapped was the former Nord 3.713 (née Ceinture 63) which was scrapped at Bapaume in 1960.

== Description ==
The boiler was based on that used on the "Revolvers" (Nord 2.231 to 2.305 series) and had a Belpaire firebox. The dome was mounted on the first ring, and a sandbox was mounted on the second. The boiler used Serve-type winglet tubes to get a push in efficiency.

The locomotives were four-cylinder tandem compounds: the rear high pressure cylinders were mounted on the same piston rod as the front low pressure ones.

The class was equipped with an automatic simpling system based on the full opening of the throttle. With the simple expansion system enabled, the locomotive was able to run with all cylinders in simple expansion, the HP having a direct atmospheric exhaust.

== See also ==
- List of Chemins de Fer du Nord locomotives
