= Ceinture 81 to 93 =

Ceinture 81–93<
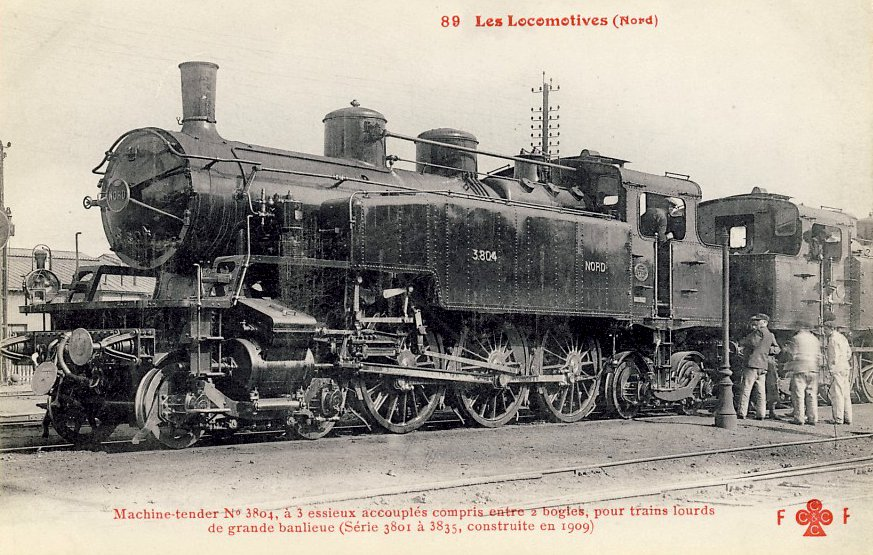
Type and origin
- Power type: Steam
- Designer: Gaston du Bousquet
- Builder: SFCM
- Serial number: 3080–3092
- Build date: 1909
- Total produced: 13
Specifications
- Configuration
  - Whyte: 4-6-4T
  - UIC: 2′C2′ n2t, 2′C2′ h2t
- Gauge: 1,435 mm (4 ft 8 1/2 in)
- Driver dia.: 1,664 mm (5 ft 5 1/2 in)
- Loco weight: Saturated: 84.00 tonnes (82.67 long tons; 92.59 short tons); Superheated: 87.65 tonnes (86.27 long tons; 96.62 short tons)
- Fuel type: Coal
- Fuel capacity: 3 tonnes (3.0 long tons; 3.3 short tons)
- Water cap.: 9,000 litres (2,000 imp gal; 2,400 US gal)
- Firebox
  - Grate area: 2.20 m^{2} (23.7 sq ft)
- Boiler pressure: 14 kg/cm^{2} (1.37 MPa; 199 psi)
- Heating surface: Saturated: 175.52 m^{2} (1,889.3 sq ft); Superheated: 119.0 m^{2} (1,281 sq ft)
- Superheater
  - Heating area: 40.6 m^{2} (437 sq ft)
- Cylinders: Two, outside
- Cylinder size: 460 mm × 600 mm (18 1/8 in × 23 5/8 in)
Performance figures
- Maximum speed: 95 km/h (59 mph)
Career
- Operators: Ceinture; Chemins de fer de l'État; SNCF
- Numbers: Ceinture: 81–93; État: 81–93; SNCF: 3-232.TA.81 – 3-232.TA.93; and 2-232.TC.1 – 2-232.TC.7
- Scrapped: 1944–1952
- Disposition: All scrapped

Ceinture 81 to 93 were a class of thirteen 4-6-4T ("Baltic") tank locomotives designed by Gaston du Bousquet of the Chemins de fer du Nord for the Syndicat d'Exploitation des Chemins de fer de Ceinture de Paris.

They were almost identical to the 3.801 to 3.865, series that the Nord had built for itself in its own workshops at La Chapelle (fr) and Hellemmes.

The Ceinture locomotives were built in 1909 by Société française de constructions mécaniques.

Six locomotives were fitted with superheaters between 1924 and 1928; Number 85 has a 21-element superheater, the remaining five, 81, 82, 84, 86, and 93, has 24-element superheaters. In addition 85 received Caprotti rotary-cam valve gear.

Eleven locomotives received feedwater heaters: eight, 81 and 85 to 91, were by ACFI; three 83, 84 and 93 were by Caille Potonie.

In 1934 at the dissolution of the Syndicat they passed to the Chemins de fer de l'État, who did not renumber them.

At nationalisation in 1938, they all passed to the SNCF, who renumbered them 3-232.TA.81 to 2-232.TA.93.

In 1940 the seven locomotives that has not received superheaters were transferred to the Région Nord as 2-232.TC.1 to 2-232.TC.7; they returned to Région Ouest and their old numbers in 1943.

Three locomotives were destroyed during World War II, the remaining ten locomotives were scrapped between 1946 and 1952. None were preserved.

Table of withdrawals
Year	Quantity in existence at start of year	Quantity scrapped	Locomotive numbers
1944	13	2	3-232.TA.88, 90
1945	11	1	3-232.TA.85
1946	10	1	3-232.TA.91
1948	9	4	3-232.TA.81, 84, 87, 92
1949	5	1	3-232.TA.89
1950	4	3	3-232.TA.82, 83, 93
1952	1	1	3-232.TA.86
