= Nord 3.1101 and 3.1102 =

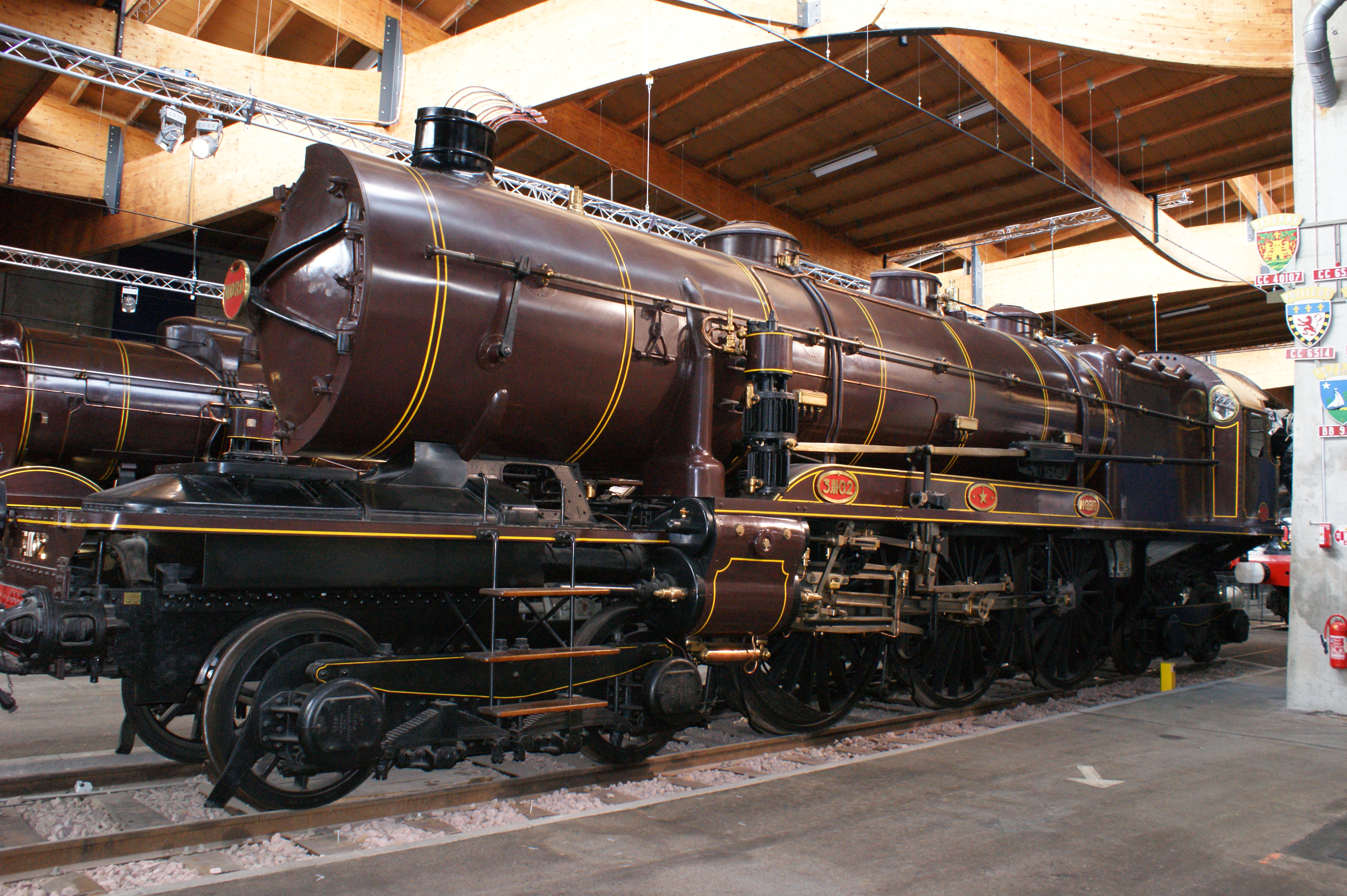
- Nord 3.1102 at the Cité du Train, March 2009
Type and origin
- Power type: Steam
- Designer: Gaston du Bousquet
- Builder: La Chapelle Workshops
- Build date: April/July 1911
- Total produced: 2
Specifications
- Configuration
  - Whyte: 4-6-4
  - UIC: 2′C2′ h4v
- Gauge: 1,435 mm (4 ft 8 1/2 in)
- Leading dia.: 1,040 mm (3 ft 5 in)
- Driver dia.: 2,040 mm (6 ft 8 3/8 in)
- Trailing dia.: 1,040 mm (3 ft 5 in)
- Wheelbase
  - Engine: 15,380 mm (50 ft 5 1/2 in)
  - Drivers: 4,300 mm (14 ft 1 1/4 in)
- Length: Loco: 15.38 m (50 ft 6 in); Loco & tender: 24.645 m (80 ft 10.3 in)
- Height: 4.250 m (13 ft 11 5/16 in)
- Axle load: 18.5 tonnes (18.2 long tons; 20.4 short tons)
- Adhesive weight: 54 tonnes (53 long tons; 60 short tons)
- Loco weight: 102 tonnes (100 long tons; 112 short tons) in working order
- Tender weight: Tare: 23.5 tonnes (23.1 long tons; 25.9 short tons); Full: 56.5 tonnes (55.6 long tons; 62.3 short tons)
- Total weight: 158.5 tonnes (156.0 long tons; 174.7 short tons)
- Fuel type: Coal, later fuel oil
- Fuel capacity: Coal: 7 tonnes (6.9 long tons; 7.7 short tons)
- Water cap.: 26,000 litres (5,700 imp gal; 6,900 US gal)
- Firebox
  - Grate area: 4.28 m^{2} (46.1 sq ft)
- Boiler pressure: 16 kgf/cm^{2} (1.57 MPa; 228 psi)
- Heating surface: 3.1101: 315.74 m^{2} (3,398.6 sq ft); 3.1102: 362.29 m^{2} (3,899.7 sq ft)
- Superheater
  - Heating area: 70.0 m^{2} (753 sq ft)
- Cylinders: Four, compound: high pressure outside, low pressure inside
- High-pressure cylinder: 440 mm × 640 mm (17 5/16 in × 25 3/16 in)
- Low-pressure cylinder: 620 mm × 730 mm (24 7/16 in × 28 3/4 in)
- Valve gear: Walschaerts
- Valve type: HP: piston; LP: slide
Performance figures
- Maximum speed: 120 km/h (75 mph)
- Power output: 2,160 CV (1,590 kW; 2,130 hp)
Career
- Operators: Chemins de Fer du Nord
- Numbers: 3.1101 and 3.1102
- Disposition: 3.1101: scrapped; 3.1102: sectioned; on display at Cité du Train

Nord 3.1101 and 3.1102 were a class of two express passenger 4-6-4 (Baltic) tender locomotives designed by Gaston du Bousquet for the Chemins de Fer du Nord, and built in the company's La Chapelle Workshops.

== Origins ==
The Nord needed more powerful locomotives to haul with increasingly heavier passenger train loads. The company's existing 4-4-2 (Atlantic) type – the 2.641 to 2.675 series (later SNCF 2-221.A) – could no longer cope; and so in 1909 the Nord's chief mechanical engineer Gaston Du Bousquet produced a design for a locomotive that had six driving wheels with four-wheel leading and trailing bogies. This was the first application of the 4-6-4 (Baltic) wheel arrangement anywhere in the world. Two prototype were built and numbered 3.1101 et 3.1102.

== Description ==
The locomotives were built by the Nord's workshops at La Chapelle, in April and July 1911, and were placed in service the same year. Fixed to the long wheel splasher were three cast brass plates: two carried the company's name and the locomotive's number, while the third, in the centre, carried a star – one of the symbols of the Rothschild family. The two locomotives differed in one respect: the type of boiler fitted – 3.1101 had a conventional fire-tube boiler, while 3.1102 had a water-tube boiler. The Nord had already tested a water-tube boiler on the 1907-built prototype 2.741 (built as a 4-4-2 Atlantic, later rebuilt as a 4-4-4 Jubilee). Unfortunately Gaston du Bousquet died in 1910 before the locomotives were finished. His successor, Georges Asselin, replaced 3.1102's boiler in 1913 with a convention fire-tube boiler. The same thing happened to 2.741 when it was rebuilt as a 4-6-0 and renumbered 3.999.

== Tenders ==
The locomotives were coupled to bogie tenders with a water capacity of 26,000 litres (5,700 imp gal; 6,900 US gal) and 7 tonnes (6.9 long tons; 7.7 short tons) of coal. The bogies used on the tenders were identical in design to those used on the locomotives.

== Service history ==
The 3.1101 and 3.1102 were allocated to La Chapelle depot. After being set aside, notably during World War I, the two Baltics were converted to oil-firing, but remained little-used. In November 1936, 3.1102 was withdrawn and then sectioned to be an exhibit at the 1937 Exposition Internationale des Arts et Techniques dans la Vie Moderne in Paris. It is now in the Cité du train. The remaining locomotive, 3.1101, was withdrawn from Calais depot in 1939 and scrapped in December the same year.

== Preservation ==
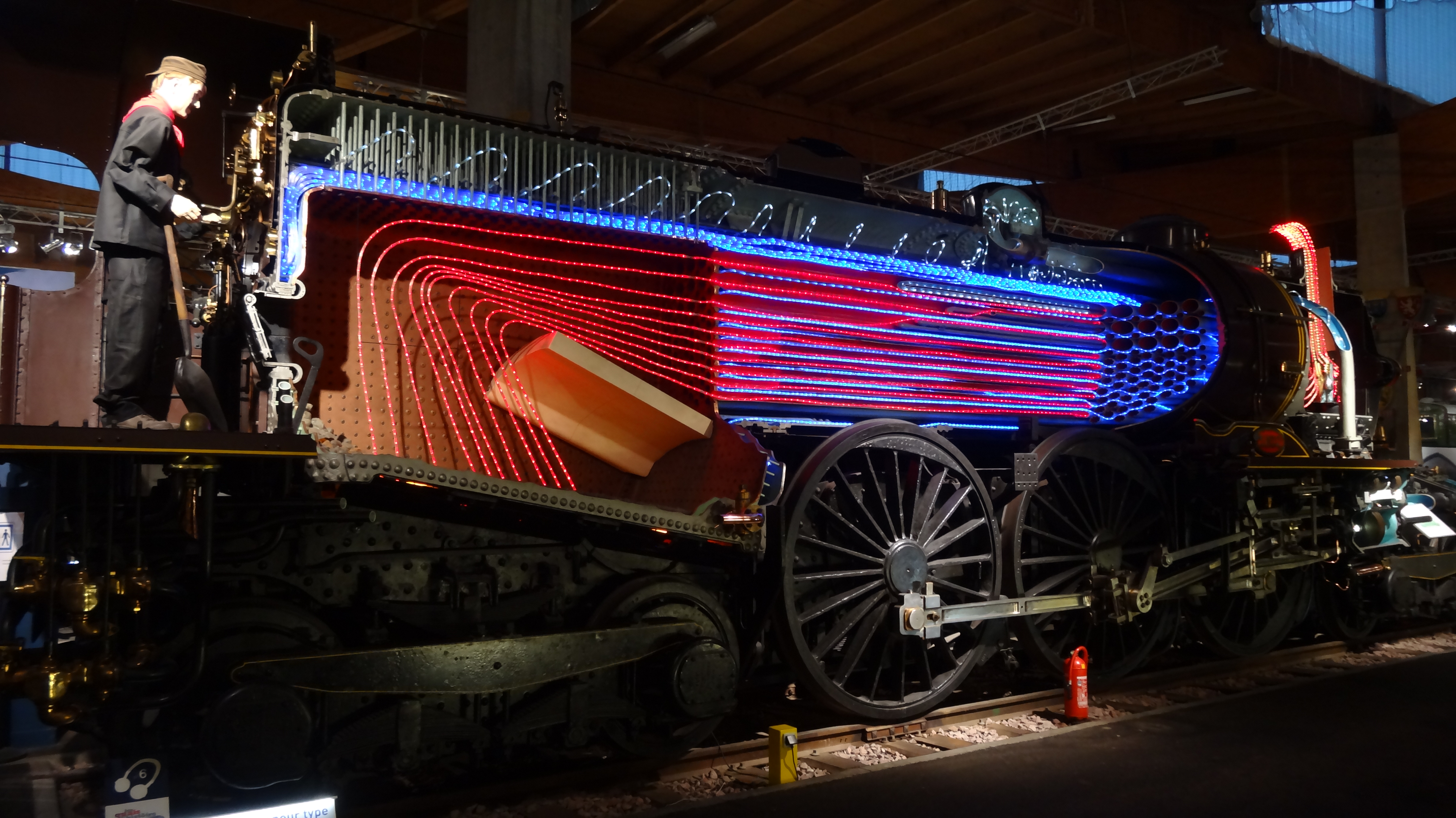
Nord 3.1102 at the Cité du Train

The 3.1102 is preserved at the Cité du Train in Mulhouse without its tender, and still sectioned, as it was for the Exposition Internationale in 1937. It is presented with a conventional fire-tube boiler; and to illustrate how it functions, various parts are traversed by luminous fibres.

Its restoration, entrusted by the SNCF in 1972 to Thouars Workshops required 12,000 man-hours of work.

== Models ==
The Nord Baltics were produced in HO scale by the now defunct French firm La maison des trains.
