= Nord 2.121 to 2.180 =

Class of 60 French 4-4-0 locomotives

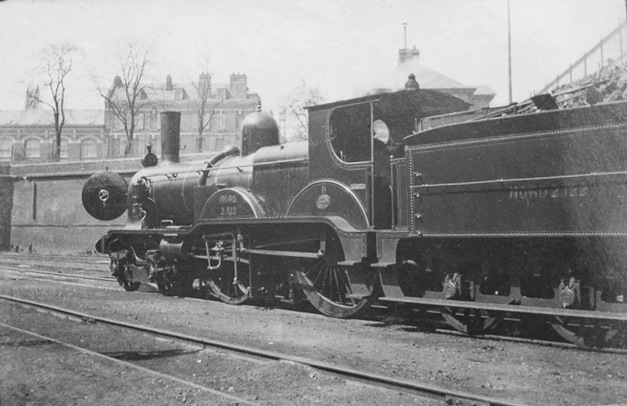
- Locomotive 2.122
Type and origin
- Power type: Steam
- Designer: Alfred de Glehn and; Gaston du Bousquet
- Builder: SACM
- Serial number: 4266–4267, 4468–4482, 4634–4653, 4667–4669, 4901–4920
- Build date: 1891–1898
- Total produced: 60
Specifications
- Configuration
  - Whyte: 4-4-0
  - UIC: 2′B n4v
- Gauge: 1,435 mm (4 ft 8 1/2 in)
- Driver dia.: 2.21 m (7 ft 3 in)
- Length: 9 m (29 ft 6 1/4 in)
- Loco weight: 49 tonnes (48 long tons; 54 short tons)
- Firebox
  - Grate area: 2.04 m^{2} (22.0 sq ft)
- Boiler pressure: 14 kg/cm^{2} (1,370 kPa; 199 psi)
- Heating surface: 155.3 m^{2} (1,672 sq ft)
- Cylinders: Four, compound, HP outside, LP inside
- High-pressure cylinder: 350 mm × 650 mm (13 25/32 in × 25 19/32 in)
- Low-pressure cylinder: 530 mm × 650 mm (20 7/8 in × 25 19/32 in)
Performance figures
- Maximum speed: 110 km/h (68 mph)
Career
- Operators: Chemin de fer du Nord
- Numbers: 2.121 – 2.180
- Nicknames: Chocolat

Nord 2.121 to 2.180 were a class of 60 four-cylinder 4-4-0 compound steam locomotives of the Chemins de fer du Nord; they were used as express passenger train locomotives. They were placed in service in 1898 and all but four had been retired by 1933. At the creation of the SNCF in 1938, the surviving locomotives were renumbered 2-220.A.1 to 2-220.A.4

== History ==
Two prototypes were designed by Alfred de Glehn, of SACM and Gaston du Bousquet of the Nord as an improvement from the No. 701 built in 1884. They were four-cylinder compound locomotives. One of them initially lacked a coupling rod, making it a 4-2-2-0, but wheelslip issues quickly ended the experiment. In 1903, locomotives 2.121 to 2.123 and 2.126 were sold to the Compagnie du Nord - Belge who renumbered them 307 to 310.

== Construction ==
SACM delivered two prototypes from their Belfort factory in 1891, and later delivered all the production locomotives:

Table of orders
Year	Nord numbers	SACM numbers	Notes
1891	2.121 and 2.122	4266–4267	Prototypes
1893	2.123 to 2.137	4468–4482	
1895	2.138 to 2.157	4634–4653	
1896	2.158 to 2.160	4667–4669	
1896	2.161 to 2.180	4901–4920	
