= Chemin de fer de Petite Ceinture =

Closed orbital railway line in Paris

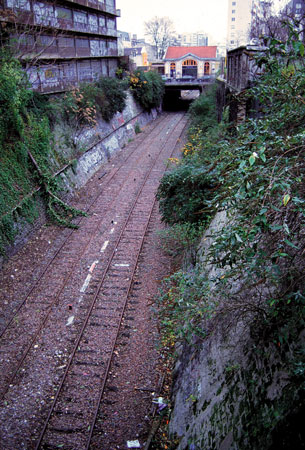
Former Charonne-Voyageurs Petite Ceinture station in 1996 (the Flèche d'Or music café at the time).

Paris's Chemin de fer de Petite Ceinture (French pronunciation: [ʃəmɛ̃ də fɛʁ də pətit sɛ̃tyʁ]) (Little Belt Railway), colloquially known as La Petite Ceinture (The Little Belt), is a circular railway built from 1852 to 1869 with 40% of underground sections as a means of supplying the city's fortification walls and transporting merchandise, then since 1862 passengers, between the major rail-company stations in Paris. Beginning as two distinct Ceinture Syndicate freight and Paris-Auteuil passenger lines from 1851, they formed an arc surrounding the northern two-thirds of Paris. The arc became a full circle of rail around the capital when its third Ceinture Rive Gauche section was built from 1867.

Although the Syndicate-owned portion of the line was freight-only in its first years, after the creation of passenger service from 14 July 1862, beginning on the north and east section of Clichy-Bercy with underground parts, the Chemin de fer de Ceinture became Paris's first metro-like urban transport—even more so after the Ceinture Rive Gauche passenger-and-freight section began. The line's passenger service was a popular means of public transport until its 1900 Universal Exposition peak-traffic year.

After Paris's first Métro line opened that year, the number of people using the Petite Ceinture's local passenger service dropped steadily until its closure in 1934. Although its freight and main line passenger trains were maintained, even that use of the Petite Ceinture had come to a practical end by the 1990s.

Since then, sections of the Petite Ceinture's trenches and infrastructure have been rehabilitated and renovated for the inter-urban RER C passenger transport service, and some of its former stations have been sold to local commerce and services. The future of the remaining stretches of the Petite Ceinture has always been a source of much debate.

== Origins ==
France's first steam-locomotive passenger rail service was its 1837 Paris-Saint-Germain railway that ran to an embarcadère (landing stage) predecessor of today's Gare Saint-Lazare. In the years following, new railways appeared in many regions across the country; but in all, early 19th-century French rail technology expansion was far behind that of its western European rivals. The Louis-Philippe government-monarchy planned to close this gap with its 1842 Legrand Star, a map of pre-programmed railway concessions that made Paris the centre of a spiderweb network of lines reaching to all regions and borders of France. By the end of the decade, the country's rail was governed by five distinct railway companies, each with exclusive monopoly over its respective regions of France.

=== Paris before the Petite Ceinture ===
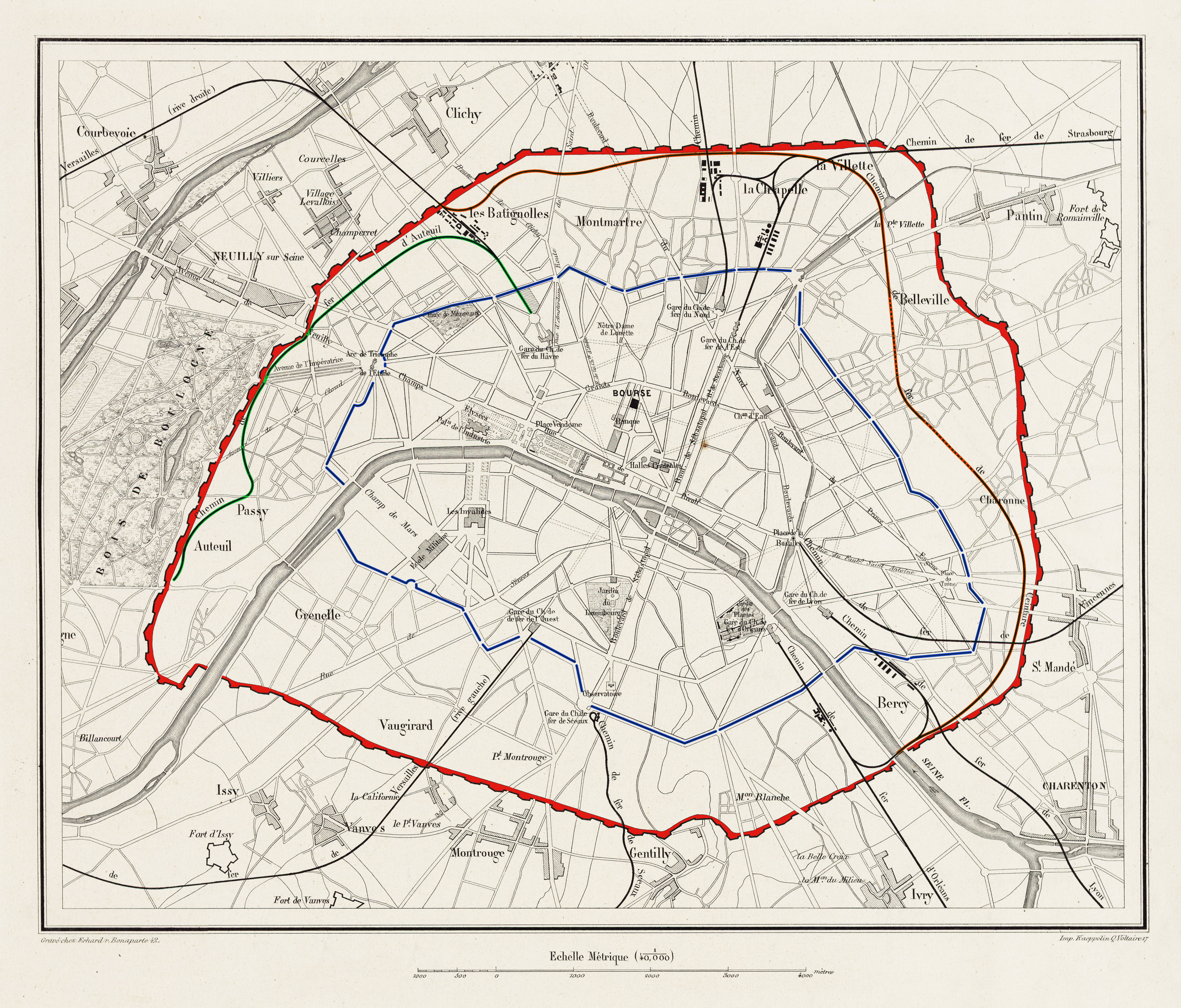
Paris in 1859 showing its fortifications, pre-1860 limits, and the Chemin de fer de Petite Ceinture, when only the Rive Droite (Right Bank) and Paris-Auteuil sections had been built.

Paris was only half its present size in the years of the Ceinture's creation, its limits being the city's 1784 Fermiers-Généraux tax wall (General Farmers tax wall) that followed today's Métro lines 6 and 2 almost exactly. From 1841, Paris dotted itself with a ring of defences a few kilometres outside these. Completed in 1845, the Thiers wall fortifications enclosed land that was mostly countryside, save for a few faubourgs (city quarters) extending for a distance along the roadways from the city gates.

In that year, Paris had five major rail stations (gares), all located just inside the city tax walls, each run by separate companies: Paris-Rouen (later Ouest, near today's Gare Saint-Lazare; Nord (at today's Gare du Nord); Paris-Strasbourg (later Est, at today's Gare de l'Est); Paris-Lyon (at today's Gare de Lyon); and Paris-Orléans (at today's Gare d'Austerlitz). Because the rail barons of the time were persuaded that direct connection to a competing line would endanger control over their respective regional monopolies, there was no company inter-station service of any kind. Freight and passengers travelling between regions of France had no choice but to commute from station to station by road through the congested capital.

=== A military idea ===
The idea for Paris's Chemin de Fer de Petite Ceinture originated with its fortifications. Rail transport was still relatively new when Paris's city fortifications were completed in 1845; and France's generals viewed the new technology as a means to quickly move troops, machinery, ammunition, and provisions between points along the circular wall. An initial 1842 study resulted in three projects for railways to the inside the fortifications, another between the forts outside, and another ring in a still larger diameter outside the city. By 1845, however, the government's increasingly urgent priority was to join the nation's railways through a Rive Droite (Right Bank) portion of the inner-fortification rails.

Because the government of the time was too financially burdened to undertake building and managing a railway on its own, it depended on France's major rail companies for financial support and management. The post-1848-revolution government was in no better position to negotiate, and all that the Second Republic government's coercive manoeuvring managed to achieve was that the rail companies made freight-exchange deals and mergers amongst themselves.

== One Ring, Three Lines ==
=== I - Syndicated Chemin de Fer de Ceinture (Rive Droite) ===
Napoleon III's coup d'état on 2 December 1851 led to creation of a new government with more grandiose visions for France's railway future. Re-opening the negotiations based on a pre-Second Empire project to connect all of Paris's railway stations through an arc of rail between the Rouen-Versailles Rive Droite (Gare-St-Lazare) and Orléans (Gare d'Austerlitz) lines—with the Versailles Rive Gauche lines (leading to today's Gare Montparnasse) joined to its Versailles-Rive Droite counterpart through a junction at Viroflay (in the suburbs to the south-west of Paris)—the Rouen, Nord, Strasbourg, Orléans (then bankrupt but state-sponsored) and Lyon companies signed participation, and the project was transformed into a decree-proposition signed into law by the Prince-President on 10 December 1851.

In this agreement, against a 1 million franc contribution from each company, the government would organise and finance the landscaping, bridges, and rails for the line, to be completed no later than two years from the concession signing. Once completed, it would be placed at the disposal of a compagnie de Chemin de fer de Ceinture de Paris (Paris Ceinture Railway Company)—not yet Rive Droite,a syndicate comprising two members of each company—for a period of 99 years, during which they would provide a service 'for freight and passengers' using rolling stock from each company.

The first stretch of rail connecting Parisian stations to be built was not part of the Ceinture concession, but originating from an earlier inter-company deal that had become a separate concession of its own, an arc of rail between the Nord and Strasbourg (later: Est) lines. Open in April 1852, it would be connected to the Ceinture upon completion. The first length of the Ceinture railway was completed 12 December 1852 between Rouen's Batignolles freight yards and the Pont du Nord, a point above the Nord company rails south of its station in Paris. The second Ceinture section delivered, between Pont du Nord and Aubervilliers (the point where the Nord-Strasbourg arc-connection joined with the Ceinture railway), was opened to service on 30 September 1853. From there, trains could travel freely between the Batignolles (Rouen), La Chapelle (Nord), and La Villette (Strasbourg-Est) freight yards. Construction of the line between the Pont du Nord and Ivry (the Rive Gauche Orléans company freight yard), as it undercut the hills of Montmartre and Belleville, was more problematic, as several landslides delayed the work. But it was delivered in one track from December 1853; freight service began from 25 March; and it was fully functional after its second rail was delivered in May 1854.

=== II - Ouest Company's Paris–Auteuil passenger line ===
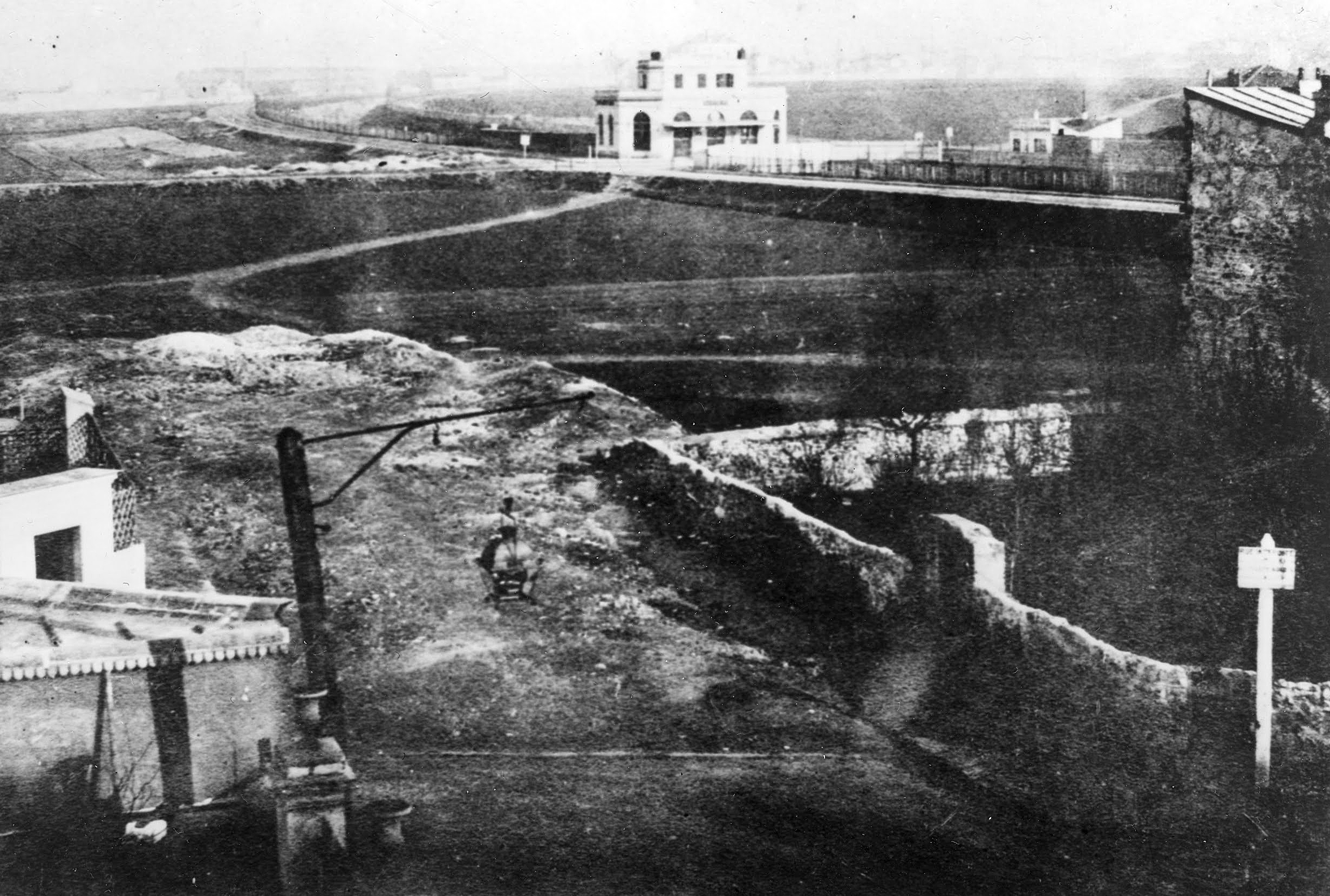
Recently constructed Courcelles Paris-Auteuil (Petite Ceinture) train station, 1854, over the trench holding the rails and quays it served, isolated in the countryside just inside Paris's fortification defences.

The Pereire-owned Ouest company requested and obtained the government railway concession that 'extended the ceinture railway through Batignolles and Auteuil' in 1852. This line was planned as passenger-only service created mainly for the Parisian bourgeoisie travelling to their country homes south-west of the city, and had nothing to do with the freight-only Ceinture line, although the government indicated in the concession agreement that the line was to be 'an extension of the Chemin de fer de Ceinture'. Leaving the Gare Saint-Lazare rails just to the north of the station, the Paris–Auteuil line arced west, passed through the town of Batignolles, then followed the interior of Paris fortifications to the south with several stops before its terminus in the town of Auteuil.

In an effort to avoid blocking traffic as the Ceinture Rive Droite did, the Auteuil passenger line was built below ground level for most of its 9.5-km (5.9-mi) length, an endeavour that required construction of 14 bridges across its entrenched path. Besides its Rue St-Lazare embarcadère terminus, also serving the Ouest company's other lines, the line had five stations: Pont-Cardinet (an SNCF station today); Courcelles (today's Pereire–Levallois RER C station); Neully–Porte Maillot; Avenue de l'Impératrice (Avenue Foch); Passy (Avenue Henri-Martin); and Auteuil (unused today). The Paris–Auteuil passenger line was inaugurated on 2 May 1854.

=== III - Ouest Company's Chemin de Fer de Ceinture Rive Gauche ===
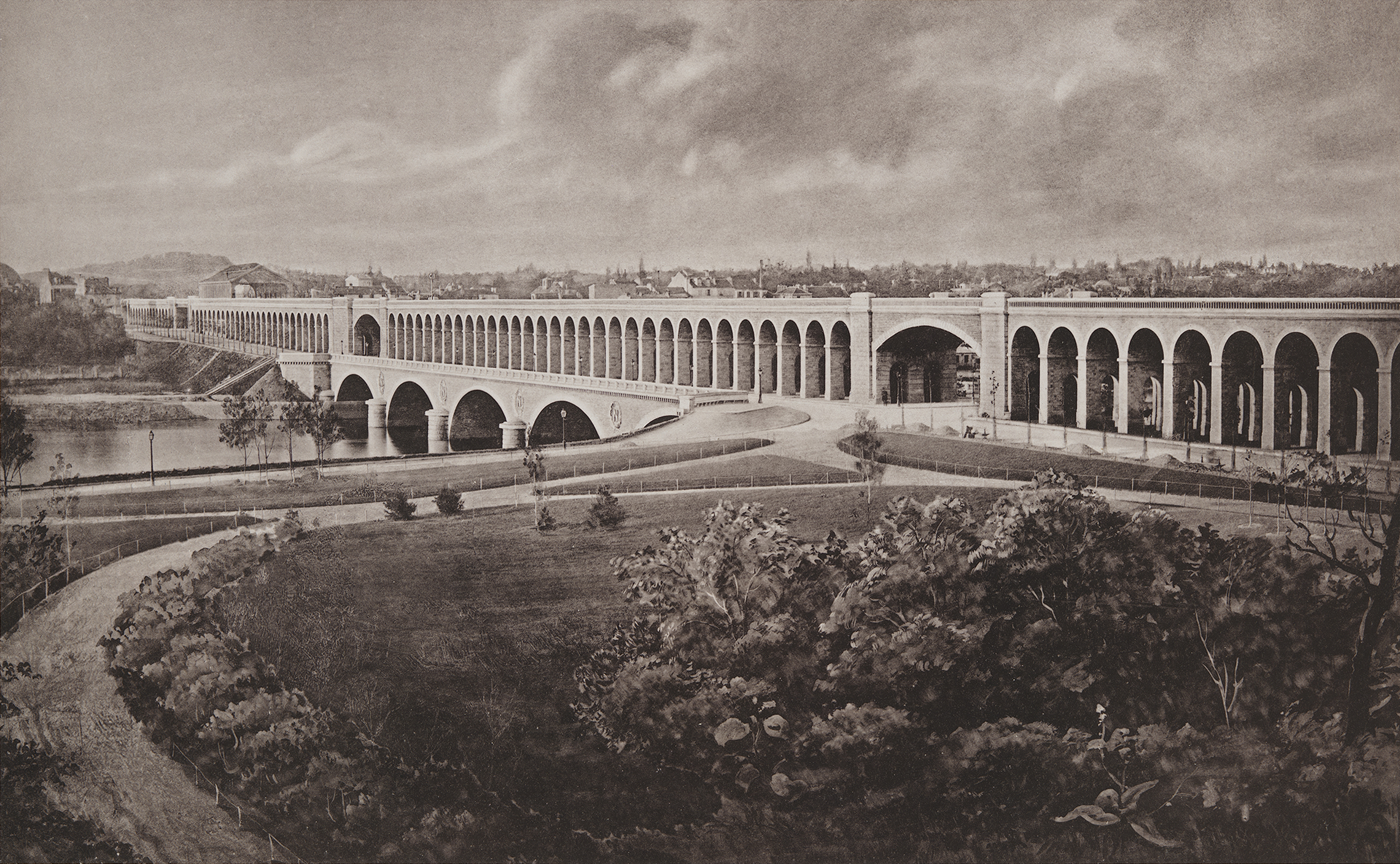
The Auteuil bridge-viaduct (Point du Jour), built from 1863 to 1867 to connect the Ceinture Auteuil line to the Ceinture Rive Gauche, open the same year.

From 1852, the state had non-officially continued its own plan-study for the Rive Gauche arc of rail to complete its original fortification-provision goals, and from 1857 this became an official pre-project that Napoleon III declared 'of public interest' in 1861. But as all the Syndicate lines were already connected, it saw no commercial interest in this. The state had begun procuring the funds necessary to purchase land and lay rail for the line even before Napoleon III's declaration, and from 1863 had begun the landscaping and bridge work required for a chemin de fer de Ceinture Rive Gauche. The bridges were needed because, unlike the Rive Droite Ceinture line, the Rive Gauche would pass over and under streets, over bridges, below underpasses, and through tunnels.

During the above, Paris had doubled in size, as Paris annexed all the 'country communes' between its city tax walls and fortifications from 1860, which put the formerly countryside Ceinture line within the new city limits. Providing passenger service for these 'new arrondissements' (Parisian administrative districts) became yet another state goal, as also the need for railway transport to the upcoming 1867 International Exposition that would bring crowds of visitors to the Left Bank's Champ de Mars (Field of Mars).

In earlier state-rail-company negotiations, the state had obtained the option to buy the Auteuil line back from the Ouest company, and used this as leverage to get the company to agree to sign a Ceinture Rive Gauche concession convention on 31 May 1865. By this agreement, the state would return the Auteuil-line concession to Ouest, complete the already-underway landscaping and bridges needed for the line, and work an 'eventual' additional concession for a rail connection between its Auteuil line and the Ceinture Rive Droite at Batignolles. All the same, the state reserved an eight-year delay during which it would have the right to purchase some or all the concession in case ongoing plans for a 'métropolitan' railway line went through. Ouest, for its part of the agreement, would lay the rail; provide all the buildings; execute and maintain rail service; and, for the Exposition, lay a 'temporary' antenna from its Grenelle station north to the Champ de Mars and make the required modifications to its Auteuil line to allow it to be used by freight trains.

The Ceinture Rive Gauche line began service on 25 February 1867, and the 'temporary' Grenelle-Champ de Mars portion of track entered service two days later, all in time for the Exposition's opening. All that remained to do was the portion of rail connecting the Auteuil lines to the Ceinture Rive Droite under the railway lines from the Gare St-Lazare, rebuilt and renamed since 1853. The underpass construction began in February 1867, and it and its new station, Courcelles-Ceinture, began service from 25 March 1869.

== Ceinture services ==
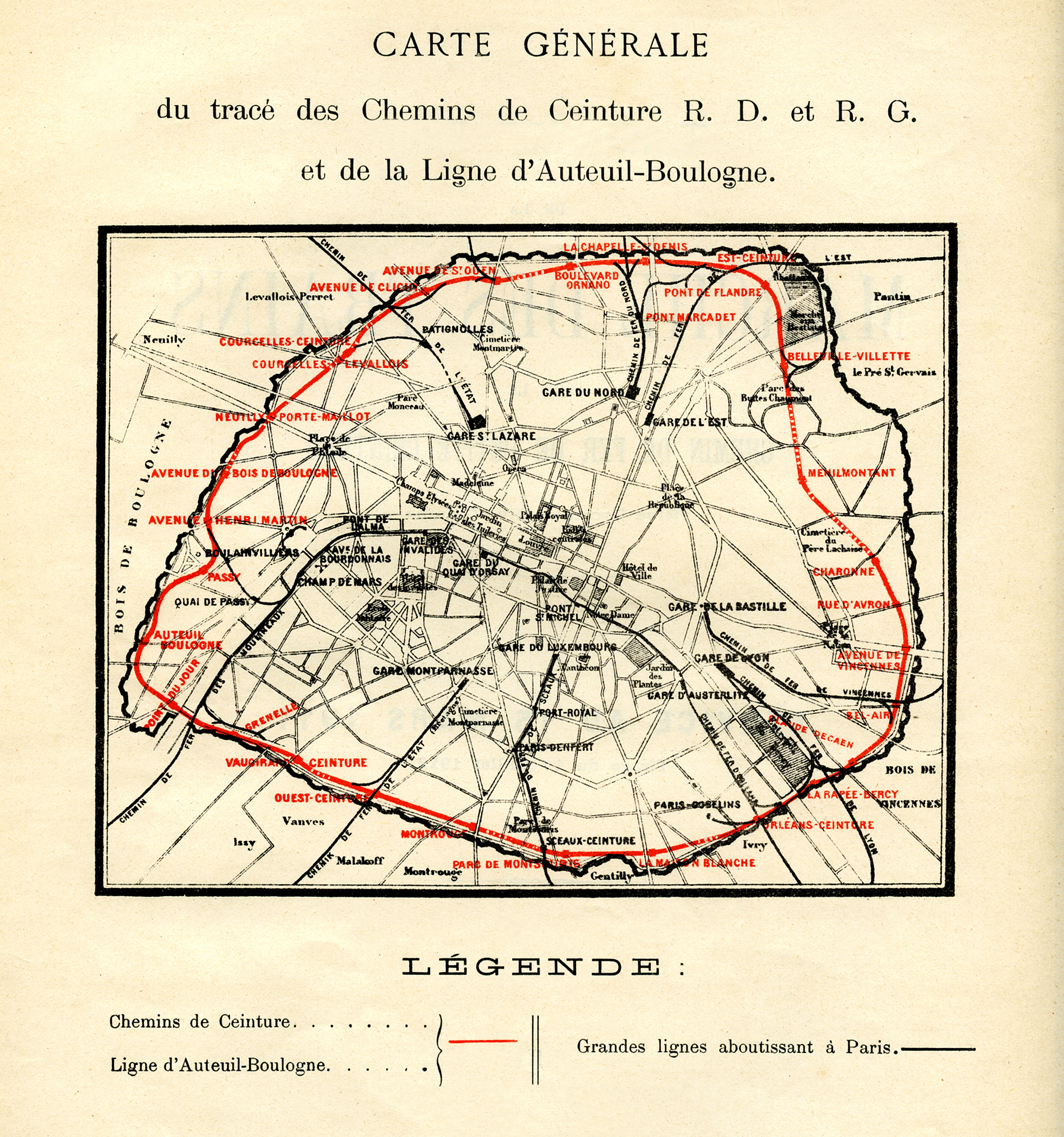
Train-schedule map of the Paris Petite Ceinture railway line,1918.

=== Early years ===
In November 1856, four Est-company locomotives and one in reserve were enough to provide freight service between the city's rail company freight yards. Trains were composed of company-owned freight cars. Freight travelling the Ceinture in the wagons belonging to the company that brought it to the capital was most often transferred to that company's wagons, an onerous process, once it arrived at the freight-yard of the company taking it elsewhere in the country.

Ceinture service was originally reserved for only 'main station' companies. As of 1 September 1855, however, it became available to local merchants receiving goods when two freight stations, Ceinture de Charonne and La Petite Villette, opened in 1855 and 1856, respectively. Although service was at first available during daytime hours only; it ran at night as well from 1857 after installation of a telegraph service. From 1861, the Nord company took over providing locomotion with seven new 040 T (numbered 551–557) engines that would become the signature Ceinture locomotive.

The Ceinture Rive Droite concession agreement stipulated that the railway should have passenger service, but the companies were content with their freight-only line. Due to increasingly hostile state pressure, the companies opened five hastily built passenger stations in 1862: Batignolles-Clichy; Belleville-Villette (near the La Petite Villette freight station); Ménilmontant; Charonne (in the existing Charonne freight yard); and La Rapée-Bercy. Two other stations, La Chapelle-Saint-Denis and Bel Air, opened before two years later. Bel Air would be the line's first 'correspondence' point from 1863, when the Est-owned Paris-Vincennes line to its Place de la Bastille terminus added a Bel-Air-Paris station just below the Syndicate's Bel-Air-Ceinture station. The Syndicate-owned passenger cars were two-level Impériales pulled by two 030 Mammouth (Mammoth) locomotives, and service was one train in each direction every two hours. Extra trains were added on holidays, and, from 1866, reduced-price morning and evening 'worker trains' as well to serve local factories.

Meanwhile, Ouest's passenger-only Paris-Auteuil line had been running trains every half-hour in the mornings and every 20 minutes in the afternoon between its Gare Saint-Lazare terminus, Batignolles-Clichy, Courcelles-Levallois, Neuilly-Porte Maillot, Avenue de l'Impératrice (later Avenue Foch), Passy, and Auteuil (the terminus) stations since its 1854 opening. From 1866, in preparation for its connection to the Ceinture Rive Gauche, its platforms were lowered and a new Auteuil terminal, lateral to the first, took trains from the Gare Saint-Lazare, creating a correspondence with the old platforms that were then dedicated to Ceinture Rive Gauche service.

The also-Ouest-owned Ceinture Rive Gauche stations after the Auteuil terminus were the Point du Jour at the end of a new bridge-viaduct across the River Seine; Grenelle (where passengers could transfer to a shuttle to the Champ de Mars); Ouest-Ceinture (a transfer point with the Ouest lines to its Paris-Versailles Rive Gauche station); Montrouge; Gentilly (correspondence with the Paris-Sceaux line to its Denfert-Rochereau terminus); Maison Blanche; and Orléans-Ceinture (correspondence with the Orléans line to today's Gare d'Austerlitz). From its 1866 opening to passenger-only service, the entire line ran alternating Syndicate and Ouest trains between the Ceinture line's then-Avenue de Clichy (formerly Batignolles-Clichy) and Auteuil terminus at a rate of one train per hour in each direction, and one every half-hour on Sundays and holidays. The entire 33-km (20.51-mi) trip, with its 21 stops, took at best 1 hour 50 minutes.

While planning to replace Paris' several intra muros (within the walls) slaughterhouses with a single complex near La Villette in 1859, Napoleon III demanded that the new slaughterhouse be connected to the Ceinture by rail. This plan became a concession and decree on 19 October 1864. It was a stretch of rail that, after leaving the Ceinture to either side of the Belleville-Villette station to form a triangle to its east, arced northward to two stations, Paris Bestiaux in the slaughterhouse marketplace and, further on to the other side of the drawbridged canal, Paris Abattoirs, in the slaughterhouse complex itself. The antenna and stations were open to service from 18 October 1867, three days before inauguration of the slaughterhouses.

Completion of the Courcelles underpass and its Courcelles-Ceinture station for the 1867 Universal Exposition meant that trains could travel in a full circle around Paris. Passengers, however, still had to change trains because they had to go over walkways to the Courcelles-Levallois station even though the Ceinture Rive Droite's terminus moved to Courcelles-Ceinture. Similarly for the Universal Exposition, the Ceinture Rive Droite dotted its line with two new temporary 'for-Exposition correspondence' stations: Est-Ceinture, where the Ceinture crossed the lines to the Gare de l'Est, and Bercy-Ceinture, over the Gare de Lyon lines (dismantled after the Exposition ended), and four new permanent stations: Saint-Ouen, Boulevard Ornano, Pont de Flandre, and Avenue de Vincennes. Replacing the Nord company engines, the Syndicate bought and ran its own 040 T locomotives, which were stored and maintained in new engine sheds near the Chapelle-Saint-Denis freight yards from 1869.

=== Growing pains ===
The Chemin de Fer de Ceinture served its military purpose when it was requisitioned by the state for the 1870 Prussian war and the siege of Paris. The Ceinture Rive Droite was only slightly damaged from Prussian bombardments from the north, but the Auteuil and Ceinture Rive Gauche lines were heavily damaged in the 1870-71 Commune civil war that followed. The Neuilly-Porte Maillot station was completely destroyed, the Auteuil terminus mostly destroyed, and the Auteuil viaduct and the Grenelle station were heavily damaged. After the conflict ended, Ceinture service returned to its half-hour cadence, begun from 16 July 1871 just before the war—although at first only in sections with trains every hour.

Although the Ceinture Rive Gauche was still a passenger-only line, a junction between the Ouest lines near the Ceinture Vaugirard station allowed freight trains a shortcut from the bifurcation at Viroflay from 1874. The Ouest company had opened a Reuilly freight station off its Paris-Vincennes line in 1877, and the Ceinture Rive Gauche Bel-Air junction opened to freight service two years later. The Ceinture Rive Gauche's first dedicated-freight station, Grenelle-Marchandises, also opened in 1879.

The Chemin de Fer de Ceinture's passenger traffic was on the rise and expected to be higher still for the upcoming 1878 Universal Exposition. Although the Nord and Paris-Lyon-Méditerranée lines still had no passenger correspondence points with the Ceinture, this changed with the 1875 opening of the Nord-line Nord Ceinture station near the Ceinture's La Chapelle-Saint-Denis' station and the Paris-Lyon-Méditerranée's Bercy-Ceinture station on its lines near the Ceinture La Rapée-Bercy station, and Est-Ceinture re-opened from 15 May 1878. The Paris-Vincennes line added a second arc of rail to the first at Bel Air that allowed trains to travel to and from Bastille in both directions from 1878. The Ouest company rebuilt a new antenna to the Champ de Mars, replacing the one dismantled in 1869, but this time permanently as the head of a still-unauthorised Paris-Moulineaux suburban railway line that was to have its terminus at the Pont de l'Alma. The Paris-Auteuil line also built a new station for the Exposition, Avenue du Trocadéro. With the temporary addition of the Est company's Paris-Vincennes trains to the Ceinture schedule, its train cadence for the duration of the Exposition rose to one every 15 minutes, and passengers to the Champ de Mars numbered more than 50,000 per day.

Pleased with its Exposition-passenger service results, the Syndicate, after a period of experimentation following the Est company's withdrawal of its trains at the Exposition's end, decided to make the 15-minute passenger service permanent from 1881. From the following year, the Paris-Auteuil section topped its service as well. In all, the Ceinture had a passenger-service frequency of four to eight trains per hour in each direction, but this cadence required total suppression of freight traffic at certain times and at certain points along the Ceinture Rive Droite line. The Ceinture Rive Gauche freight service was still insufficient for local commerce, however, which led to the opening of a new Glacière-Gentilly freight yard from 1882.

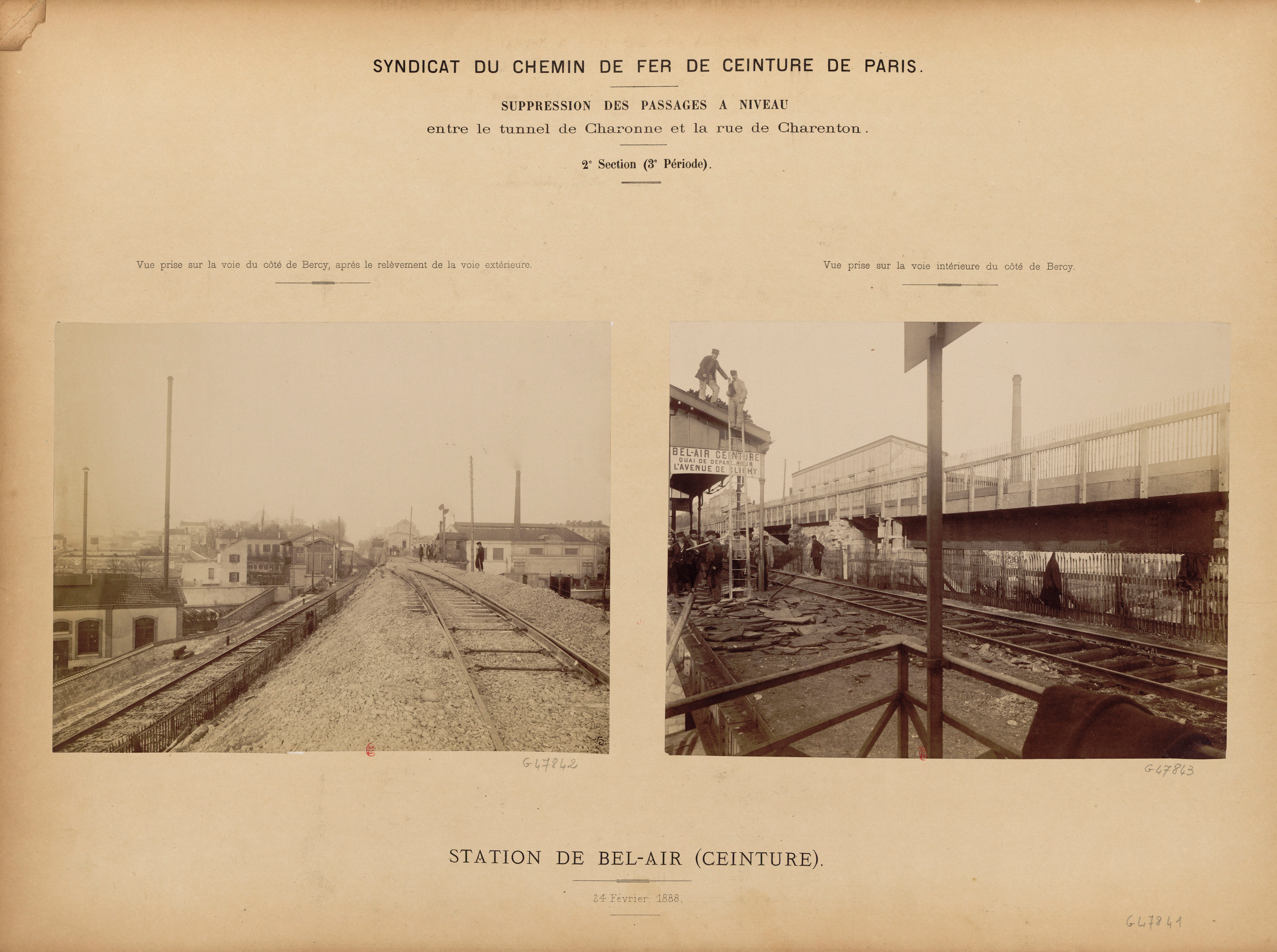
Views of Paris's former Petite Ceinture Bel-Air station and rails, undergoing modifications to raise the railway above its former street-level crossings.

Line congestion was already a problem by then. A plan to build a Chemin de fer de Grande Ceinture extra-muros (outside-the-walls) railway ring had already been underway since 1875. The company least concerned with freight matters, the Ouest, had abstained from the agreement but in 1880 proposed merging the two Ceinture syndicates (Petite and Grande) to allow the companies to transfer their inter-company freight traffic to the outer ring and dedicate the inner ring to passenger and Parisian-commerce-destined freight. In exchange for its participation, Ouest offered its Ceinture Rive Gauche and Courcelles bifurcation concessions, but with the demand that its Paris-Auteuil line be exempt. This agreement was approved by decree on 11 November 1881, and effective from April 1883.

Although the now-named Petite Ceinture was isolated in the suburban countryside in the year of its inauguration, it was an integral part of the city. The Paris-Auteuil and Ceinture Rive Droite section plans had accounted for this eventuality, but the Ceinture Rive Droite had many countryside-style road-crossings, a hindrance that became more important as Paris's population grew. Remedying this problem was made possible by the Syndicate's shift of its freight transport to the Grande Ceinture; and so from 1886, with service reduced to one rail in many places, city engineers and Syndicate workers built bridges, dug trenches, re-landscaped, and rebuilt stations in time for the 1889 Universal Exposition.

The Ouest's Ceinture Rive Gauche northwards antenna would serve the Exposition once again, but this time as the head of its Ligne des Moulineaux railway line that, finally built between 1886 and 1889, crossed the Ceinture on its way into Paris towards its Champ de Mars terminus. Also for the 1889 Exposition, the Ceinture eliminated the change of trains required between Courcelles-Ceinture and Courcelles-Levallois. From that point, Ceinture trains could travel a full circle around Paris, but no longer went to the Gare Saint-Lazare, which was serviced through a transfer to or from a Paris-Auteuil train at Courcelles-Levallois. To accommodate this change, the Syndicate modified its ticketing, signage, and colour-coding to differentiate trains and their destinations more easily.

=== La Belle Époque ===
Plan of the 1889 Universal Exposition, with the expanded Champ de Mars rail station to the left of the Eiffel Tower.

The Petite Ceinture had become a popular mode of transport towards the end of the 19th century. The number of Ceinture passengers was near 5 million passengers per year in 1880, but rose sharply from then at 13 million in 1883, peaking at between 18 and 19 million for the 1889 Universal Exposition that was accredited with a 'boost' of around 4 million visitors during its eight-month duration from May to November. A train every 15 minutes in both directions was the absolute minimum cadence, and, after the exposition's end, service to the Gare St-Lazare was re-established. Two of those trains travelled between St-Lazare and Courcelles-Ceinture and the other two in a full Courcelles-Ceinture/Courcelles-Ceinture circle, a 1 hour-30 minute trip.`

The Syndicate Ceinture passenger cars were largely unheated, oil-lit impériale ouverte (bilevel or double-decker, with an open top deck); but from 1884 an order of 16 new impériale fermée (covered bilevel cars) gas-lit cars was made, and all wagons were heated from winter of 1891. That same year, the Syndicate fleet included 24 single-level first-class cars, 77 second-class cars, one mixed-class car (impériale fermée), and 51 baggage and freight wagons. As the open-second-level cars had been the cause of a few under-tunnel-and-bridge deaths and suicides over the years, they began to be replaced progressively, under pressure from the state, by new single-level cars, profiting also from the occasion to replace Ouest material they were still using since the Syndicate's merger with cars owned by the Syndicate itself. By 1897, only a few open-top-deck cars remained in circulation.

Interchange with transport to the city centre improved as well, with, from 1893, a twin junction to the Nord lines and additional platforms to the Chapelle-Saint-Denis station that not only allowed passengers a shorter transfer time but also eased the passing of between-main-station trains that had had to use the off-Ceinture La Chapelle freight-yard junction until then. From its completion, Nord—in exchange for giving 40% of profits made to the Syndicate—added its trains to the Ceinture schedule with a new full-circle Nord-Station-Nord-Station service. Already decreed 'of public interest' since 1889, the new Rue d'Avron station opened by the street of the same name in 1895, lightening the load of the nearby Avenue de Vincennes station. The new station would be used, from 1896, to experiment with raising the platform from its track level to a height that would ease passenger access to the trains. When it was deemed a success and extended to all Syndicate stations, it condemned many of the line's older step-access cars to disuse.

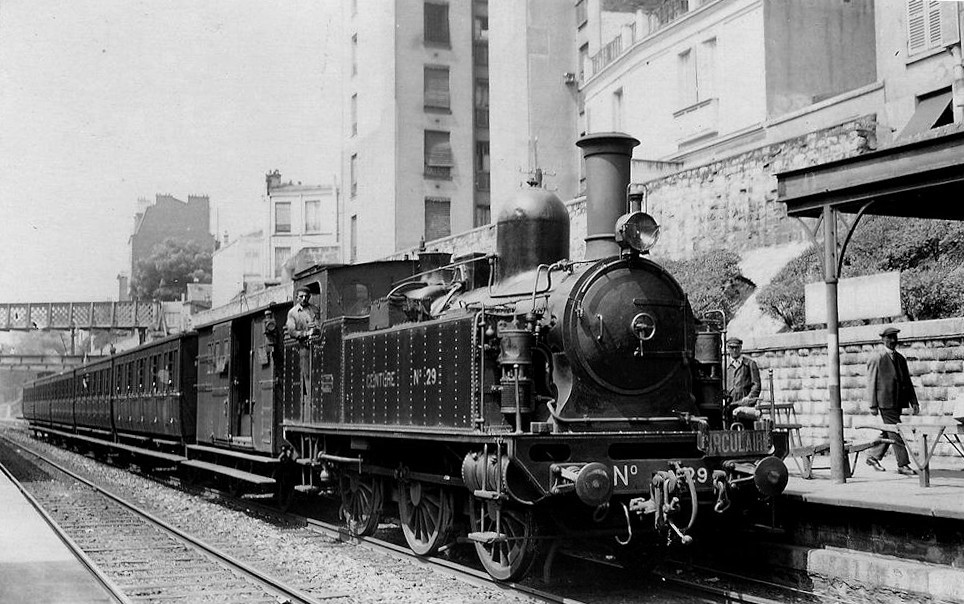
A Syndicate Ceinture train at what seems to be the Boulevard Ornano station around 1900.

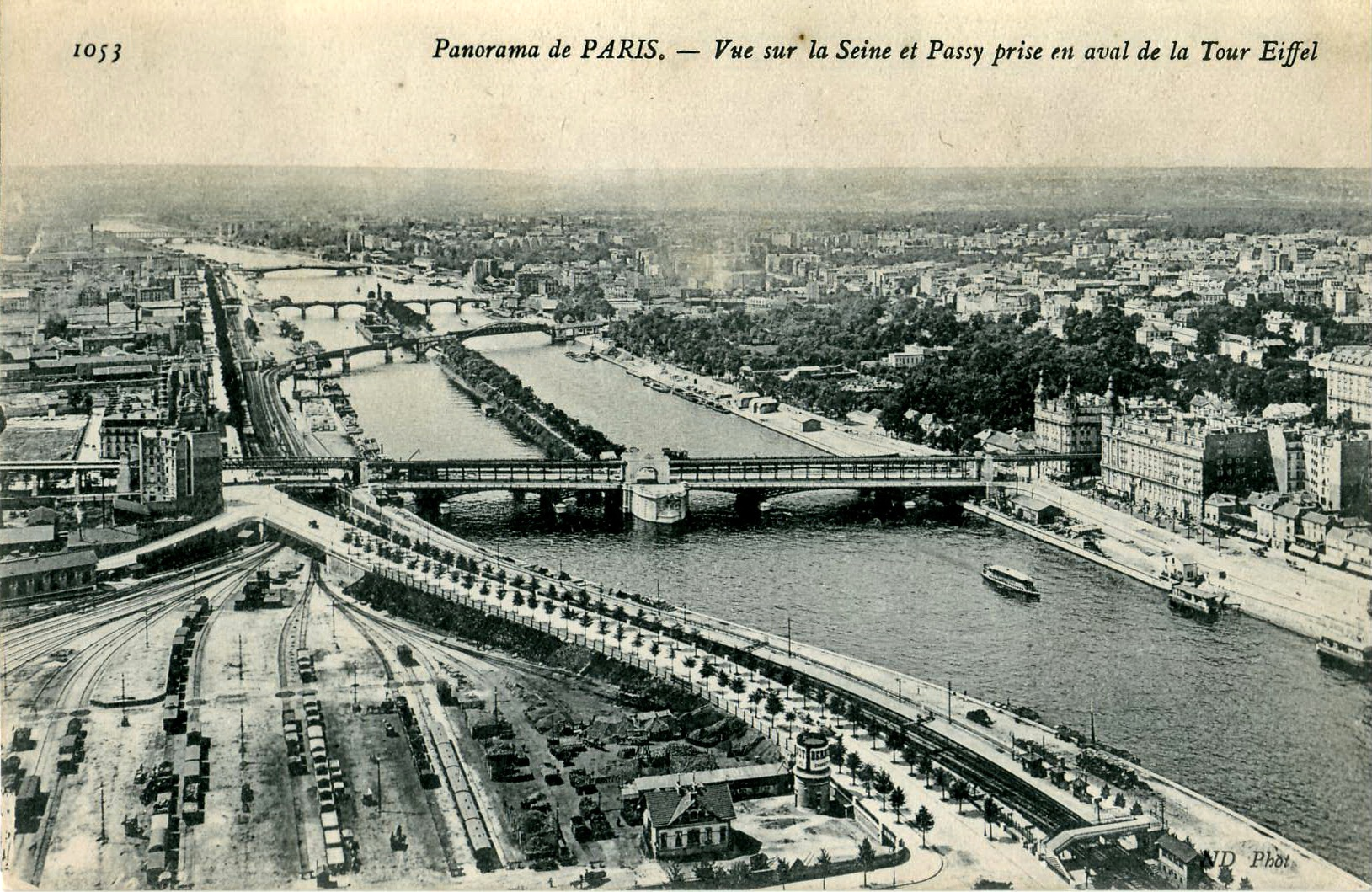
View of the Ouest Champ du Mars station during the 1900 Exposition, with the Boulainvilliers bridge-viaduct for Batignolles trains in the background.

The Ouest company, in light of the upcoming 1900 Universal Exposition, was granted a concession on 6 July 1896 to extend its Moulineaux line from its Champ de Mars terminus to a new Invalides station. Ouest not only extended its line but also lowered its river-hugging length into a trench to eliminate its railway crossings at every bridge and added four new, minuscule, Chinese-pagoda-esque stations. Travelling from the Ceinture inwards, one passed the Pont Mirabeau (later Javel), Pont de Grenelle, de la Bourdonnais, and Pont de l'Alma stations before reaching the Invalides terminus.

Not concerning the Ceinture directly but related to this extension was another Ouest project approved on 14 June 1897: the Boulanvilliers line extension that, crossing the river on a viaduc de Passy (Passy viaduct) just below the Pont de l'Alma, would allow Ceinture and St-Lazare passengers a much shorter trip between the city centre and the Champ de Mars. It was an extensive project. The Paris-Auteuil ravine between Courcelles-Levallois and Passy was widened into a straight-walled trench wide enough to accommodate two additional sets of rails to either side of the existing line; and below the Avenue Henri Martin station, the new lines entered curving tunnels to pass below the Paris-Auteuil lines to emerge at a new entrenched Boulanvilliers station before, after passing through another tunnel, emerging on the river-crossing viaduct that curved left to meet the path of the Moulineaux line rails towards the Champ de Mars and Invalides terminus.

Several other improvements as the 1900 Universal Exposition approached: a temporary Claude Decaen stop that would become permanent from 1906 to serve Exposition installations in the Parc de Vincennes, new Syndicate cars and engines (more Nord-built 030Ts), electric lighting for all 186 cars, and the Champ de Mars station was modified with, in addition to its platforms serving for trains continuing to Invalides, 20 platforms as a terminus for trains from all destinations. The schedule was modified as well to accommodate the many shorter-distance navette (shuttle) trains travelling to and from the Exposition. In all, the Champ de Mars station transported 3,979,429 passengers, and the total number of Ceinture passengers for 1900, all companies combined, was 38,985,079 passengers, its absolute peak.

=== Decline ===
Construction of what would become the Paris Métro had been underway since 1898. The Ceinture had created a junction in 1899 with the Est/Ouest metro line company ateliers (workshops) near the Porte de Vincennes, one of the city gates of Paris, and used it to deliver rolling stock to Paris's first Métro line, the Porte Maillot–Porte de Vincennes line, inaugurated on 19 July 1900. The Syndicate was already preparing to meet future competition through lowering passenger ticket prices and increasing rush-hour train frequency. The Ouest company, perhaps already predicting the inevitable, withdrew its engines and cars from Ceinture circulation after its Boulainvilliers service began from 1901. The Syndicate replaced these with material of its own and adjusted its train schedules to fill in the slack. Fifteen new passenger-train engines, Nord 230Ts, arriving between 1902 and 1903, reduced the time it took for a full-circle trip by 10 minutes.

Contrary to these measures, the Syndicate reversed its stance on freight traffic and returned to its pre-Exposition Petite Ceinture freight itineraries in 1902. One year later, it compensated the Ceinture Rive Gauche's freight insufficiency with the opening of a new freight-yard that had been in the works since 1879, Paris-Gobelins. Just west of there in the same year, the Ceinture opened a Paris-Brancion livestock station below the still-expanding Vaugirard slaughterhouses, and the Charonne-Marchandises freight-station expanded in 1904.

Passenger numbers had already begun to drop by then, with a 4.55% drop between 1902 and 1903. The Ceinture reduced its minimum train cadence from six per hour in each direction to four from 1 April that year, and the North company stopped its Nord-Nord circular service between 1907 and 1908, replacing its access to the Nord main station through a shuttle service between it and La Chapelle-Saint-Denis. The Syndicate, most likely because of its loss of 3 million passengers in 1907–1908 from 28 million, refused to fill the void and instead reorganised its then-Syndicate-only passenger service from Courcelles-Ceinture to Courcelles-Ceinture with two trains per hour in the evening, three per hour during the daytime, and six per hour during rush-hours.

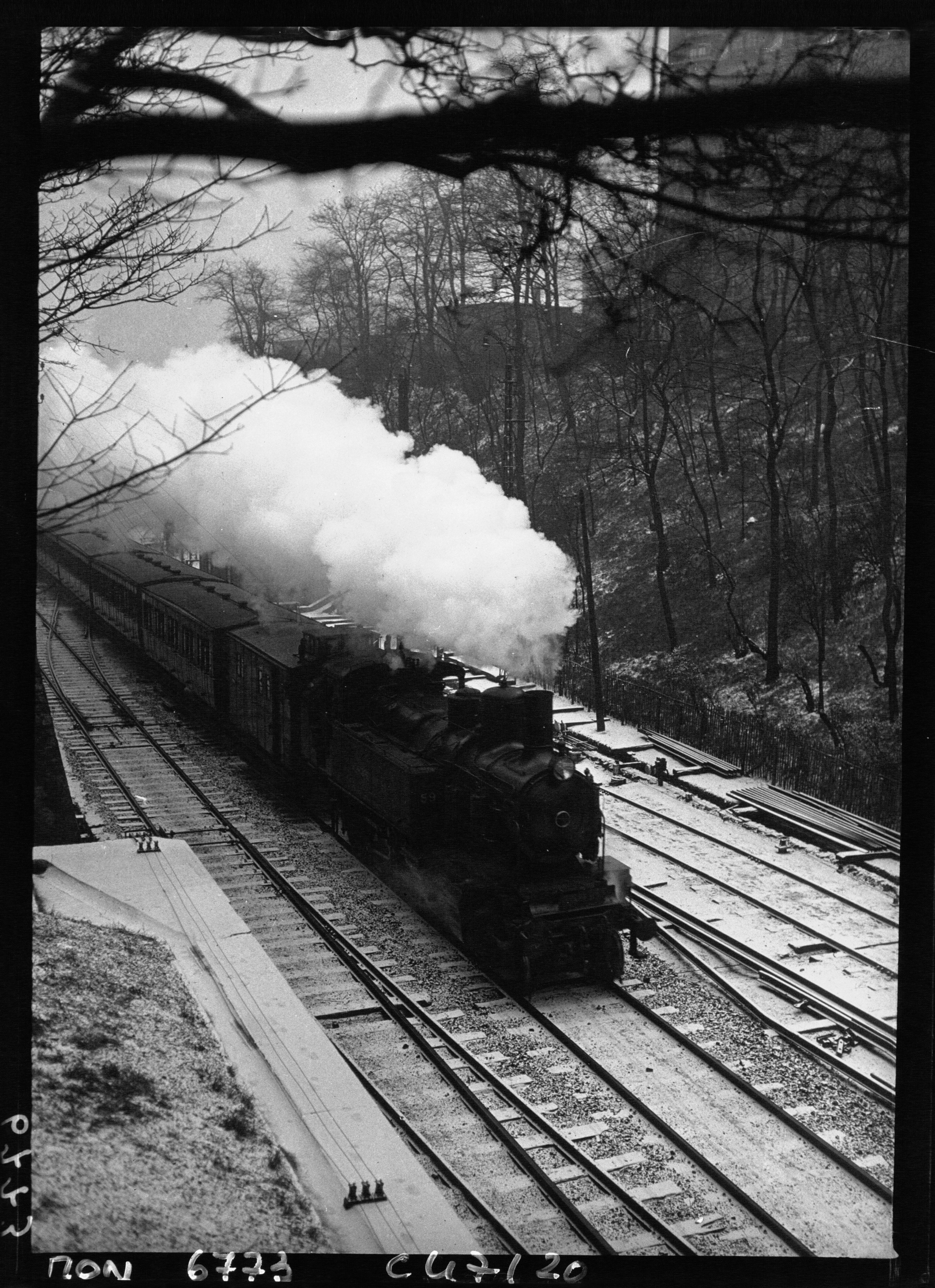
One of the last Petite Ceinture de Paris passenger trains, 1933, before its passenger service closed a year later. View from the Buttes-Chaumont ravine slope.

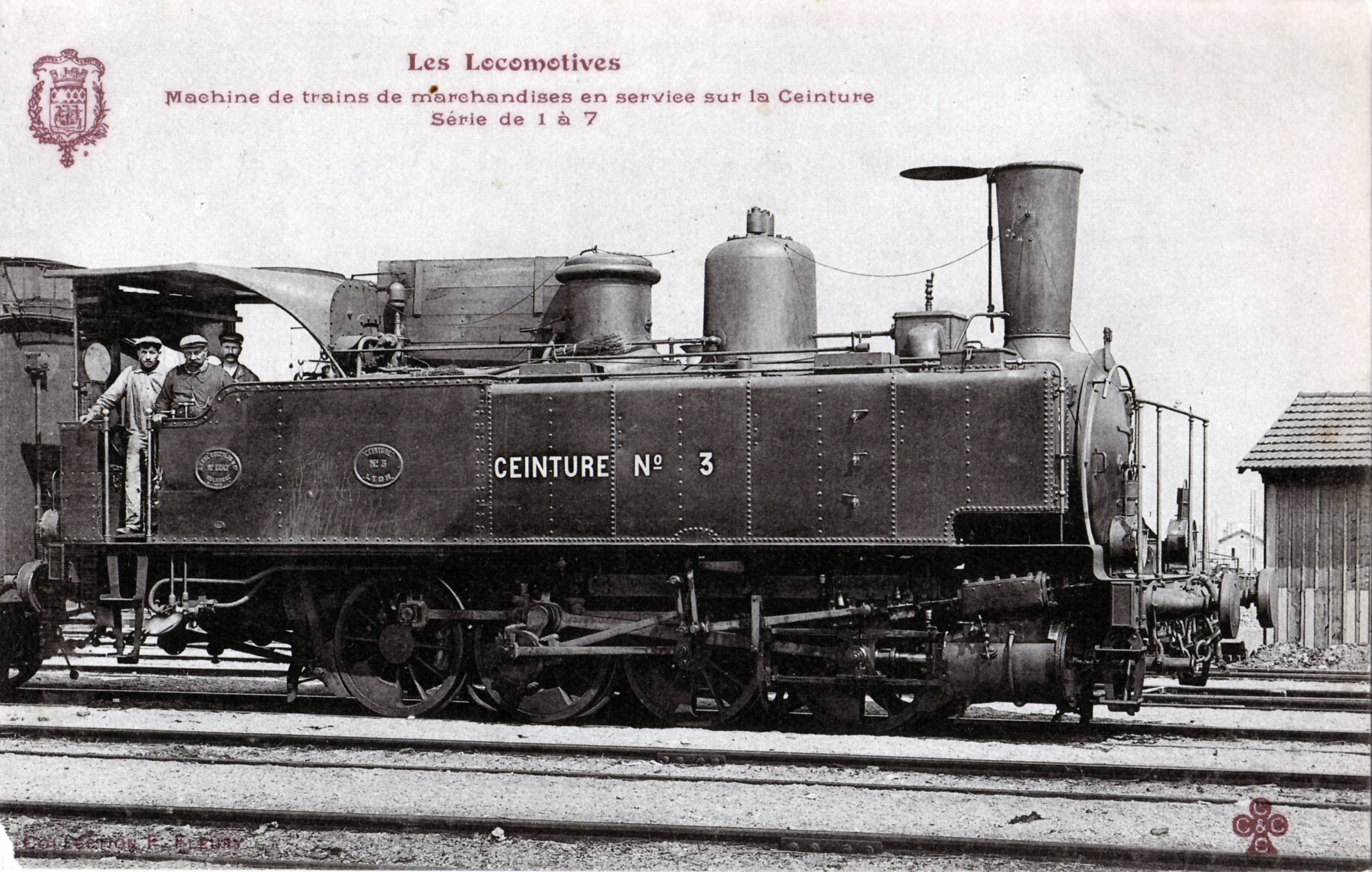
Ceinture No. 3, an 0-8-0T locomotive built by André Koechlin (No. 1247 of 1870); later Nord 4.963, then SNCF 040.TB.2.

Freight, on the other hand, was actually increasing. Between 1905 and 1911, the Syndicate added new Ceinture-access junctions to its Aubervilliers freight yard, to the Nord-Est junction, and to the Ceinture line by its Pont de Flandre station; added direct-access junctions to the northern and southern junctions of the Belleville-Villette freight yard; and expanded its Gobelins freight yard. From 1909, the Ceinture had 13 new Nord 3.800-type engines (numbered 81 to 93) and three new 0-8-0T engines (numbered 14 to 16). These latter would be the last steam engines ever ordered by the Syndicate.

After a slight increase because of the Metro's immobilisation in the 1910 floods, Ceinture passenger traffic continued its decline to 17 million passengers for 1911. The Syndicate reduced train frequency again that year, with only four trains per hour in each direction at peak hours and two trains per hour the rest of the day. The onset of World War I slowed passenger exodus somewhat; but because of a lack of workers and the price of combustibles, the Syndicate stopped its service to Paris-Auteuil from December 1915, and the Ceinture's termini became Auteuil and Courcelles-Ceinture.

The Auteuil line's 1854 Batignolles station was destroyed during renovation and enlargement of the Batignolles tunnels to the Gare St. Lazare from 1911. A temporary replacement station that took the name Pont Cardinet from 1919 became the line's terminus in 1922 when, after a collapse of the Batignolles tunnels interrupting rail-traffic in 1921, it was moved there after completion of the station's definite construction. From then, the only connection to the Gare St-Lazare from the Ceinture was through the Boulainvilliers antenna, electrified since 1919; but this service, little used by passengers, ended from 1924. The Auteuil line was joined to the Ceinture only through its Auteuil terminus from then; and the two lines would become further distinct when the Auteuil line, with the Boulanvilliers antenna, was electrified one year later. Meanwhile, the Syndicate Petite Ceinture's passenger traffic was losing about 1 million passengers every two years, and by 1926 dropped below 8 million.

When the city began demolishing its fortifications from 1919, the Ceinture saw an opportunity to relieve its over-encumbered Charonne-Marchandises freight station by expanding it yet further onto the freed land. The city, however, refused its request, a setback that may have been behind the Syndicate's decision to return all its from-main-line freight traffic to the Grande Ceinture the same year. In another effort to ease its freight-traffic overload, the Syndicate purchased its first and only diesel engine in 1932: an 800-horsepower Sulzer machine numbered D1, to aid the composition of freight wagons before they were attached to a steam engine for Ceinture transit.

The number of Syndicate passengers had dropped to 10,247,533 by 1920, and to 9,440,524 by 1922. In the same period, the Auteuil line had 9 million passengers in 1920; a drastic drop to 6 million one year later; and by 1930, only 4,109,000 passengers. From 4 May 1931, several letters and meetings about the situation with the Minister of Public Works resulted in a plan to end passenger service for the line and replace it with Petite Centure bus service running along the Boulevards Maréchaux between Courcelles-Ceinture and Auteuil. In the final agreement signed by the Minister on 28 February 1934, the Syndicate was authorised to end its passenger service from 1 April that year, and the same day, a new bus service was launched alongside the line as "Bus PC" (Petite Ceinture bus).

== Local freight role, dismantlement, and abandon ==
The end of the Petite Ceinture's passenger service also saw the dissolution of the Grande-Ceinture-Petite-Ceinture Syndicate, and the concession obligations were divided between the Est, Nord, and État (the state-owned entity that had since bought the Ouest company) railway companies in a decree on 23 October 1934. The future of the Paris-Auteuil passenger line, now owned by the État company, had been a subject of debate since the purchase of the line by the French State (as the État company) 10 years earlier. First proposed as an addition to the still-growing Métropolitan underground railway network, the state also imagined extending its electrified service along the former Ceinture Rive Gauche line, but in the end service continued as before with the only change being, modification of a tarification to a single-class Métro-type ticket and fee from 1935.

The Nord company alone ran the remaining Rive Gauche, Rive Droite, and Courcelles portions of the Petite Ceinture from 1935, which meant the closing of the Syndicate-owned La Chapelle-Saint-Denis engine hangars. Discussions about re-opening a Petite Ceinture passenger service beginning the same year ended fruitlessly two years later, with the only change being a "Courcelles-Ceinture à Auteuil-Boulogne" renaming. In 1938, the line was transferred to the new SNCF national railway company.

World War II left the Petite Ceinture practically unscathed, although a 1943 allied bomb aimed at the Javel and Billancourt factories damaged an arch of the Point du Jour bridge, and the 1944 Liberation of Paris made the Ceinture the scene of many a skirmish. An agreement earlier that year granted the Ceinture rail between its Champ de Mars freight yard and the east of its Avenue de Clichy station to the Region Ouest (former État) company-member of the SNCF formed in 1938; this length of rail would later become part of the future RER C through Paris.

The Courcelles embranchement (a junction that divides into two or more separate paths), practically unused and reduced to one track since 1934, disappeared underneath a 1950s-era building project and the Courcelles-Ceinture-correspondence was replaced with a 'Métro-like' tunnel. A later building project swallowed the path of the disaffected rail and destroyed the old Courcelles-Ceinture station a few years afterward. Even though there was no longer local passenger service on the line, it was still used by many freight and passenger main line trains until the end of 1980.

Freight traffic had actually accelerated since the end of Petite Ceinture passenger service. The Tolbiac freight yard was renovated from 1954; and from 1972, Gobelins-Marchandes became an underground station with access ramps for trucks making deliveries to local commerces. The last freight services ended in 1993, when all remaining freight stations closed.

Touristic trains ran on the line until mid-2000. On 23 July 2019, a train ran to the south of the line to move coaches stocked near the Bercy-Charenton station.

Since December 14, 2021, a regular freight service has used a portion of the line in the 17th arrondissement every week.

== Later state and re-use ==
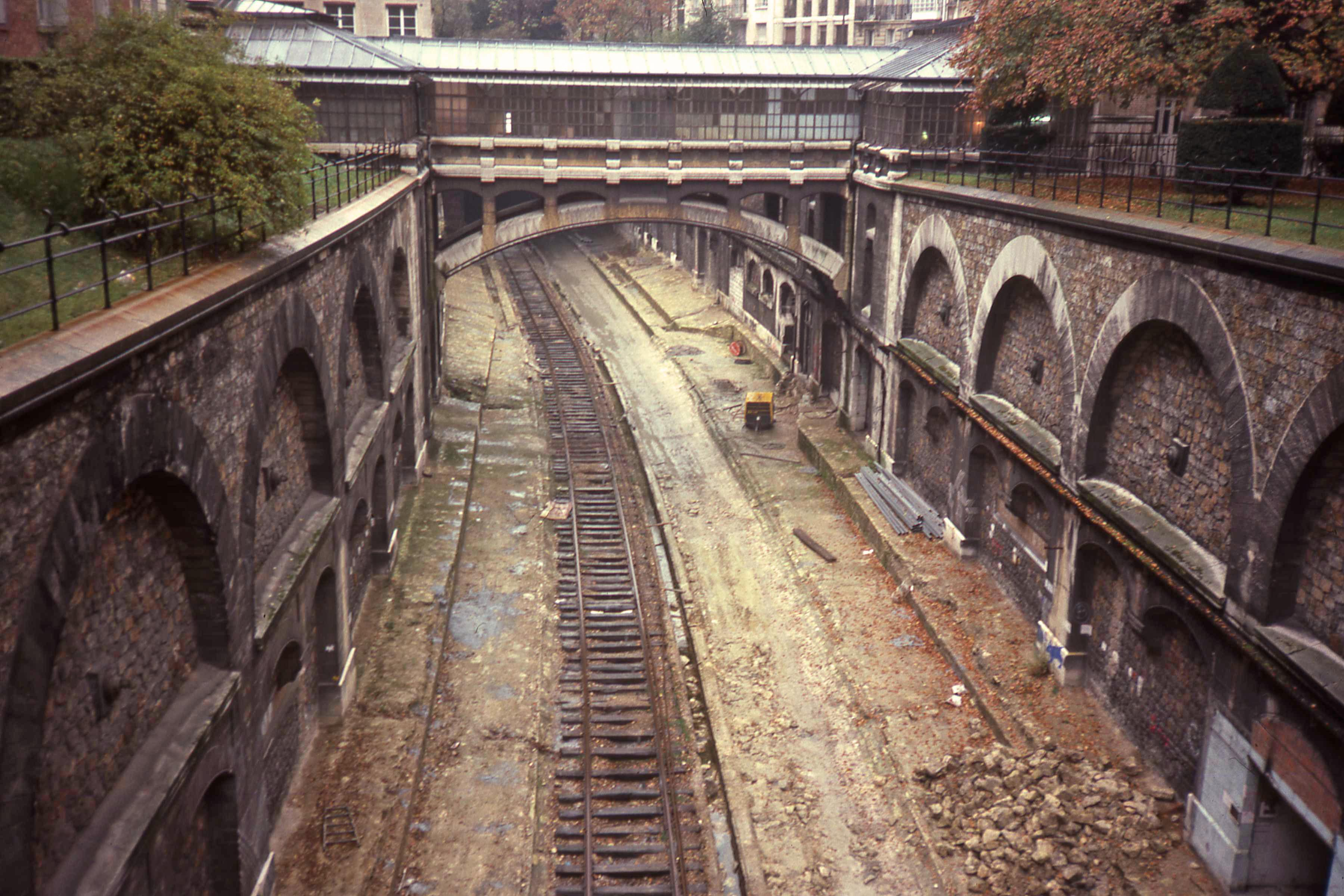
Rails of the Auteuil-Champ-de-Mars Boulainvilliers connection below the Boulainvilliers station being removed in 1984, in preparation for its transformation into the RER C.

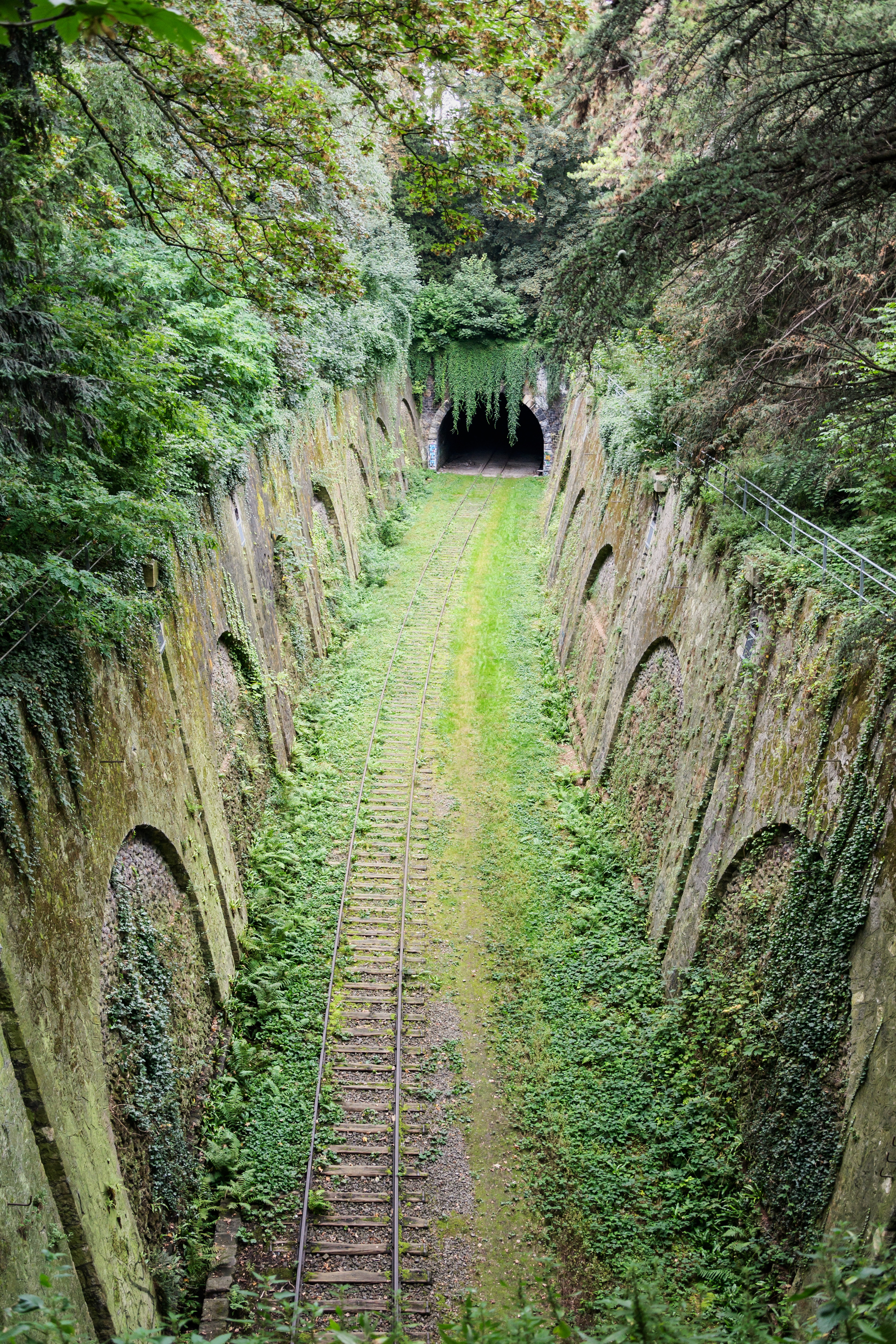
Petite Ceinture railway line passing through the Parc Montsouris.

The connection between Gare du Nord and Gare de l'Est was in use until the 2000s, but use fell dramatically as of 2011. Passenger and freight services from both stations were hauled by engines from the SNCF depots at La Chapelle and Pantin, seldom exchanging rolling stock. The Grande Ceinture became used to swap stock and as a diversion line.

When plans to reanimate Paris's tramway in a ring encircling Paris began from 1995, re-using parts of the Petite Ceinture was under serious consideration. However, the planning board opted for a line along the Boulevards des Maréchaux (Boulevards of the Marshals), a ring of boulevards, formerly a road to the interior of the city's former Fortifications defenses. The first of these Maréchaux tram lines, Line 3, was inaugurated on 16 December 2006.

Lack of use allowed nature to take over many sections of the line. Although access to the unused rail tracks was partially forbidden, enthusiasts explored it nonetheless, describing it as a quiet, natural garden space within the city of Paris. One tunnel in the 14th arrondissement even came to host a large colony of pipistrelle bats. Several projects were initiated in 2007 to temporarily transform the rail and surrounding area into urban parks; however, these parks would have to be reversible, in accordance with the agreement between the city and the SNCF Réseau owner, as the line was still part of the French railway network. Three sections of it were opened to the public, one of the legally accessible parts being the Petite Ceinture in the 15th arrondissement in southern Paris, then a section in the 20th arrondissement on 23 March 2019. As of April 2025, eight sections had public access.

The Ligne d'Auteuil closed in 1985 to make way for the Réseau Express Régional (RER) C line (Regional Express Network C line). The RER C was extended to Montigny–Beauchamp and Argenteuil after construction of a new tunnel crossing north-west Paris. The line branched off at Champ de Mars, crossing the River Seine, and from there went underground. The Ligne d'Auteuil was covered in 1988, and the line between Avenue Henri Martin and Courcelles was reduced from four tracks to two, exiting Paris in a tunnel ending at Clichy. Most areas above the RER C tracks were repurposed as parks, public spaces, or parking lots for cars.

List of Ceinture Stations - Later State

Site	Function	Actual state (as of 2017)	Observations	Original aspect	Today
Point du Jour	Passenger station	Destroyed			
Auteuil-Boulogne	Passenger station	Not in service	Re-purposed as a restaurant		
Passy	Passenger station	Not in service	Re-purposed as a restaurant		
Avenue Henri Martin	Passenger station	In service	In use as the Avenue Henri Martin RER C Passenger station		
Avenue de Bois de Boulogne	Passenger station	In service	In use as the Avenue Foch RER C Passenger station		
Neuilly Porte-Maillot	Passenger station	In service	In use as the Neuilly - Porte Maillot RER C Passenger station		
Courcelles-Levallois	Passenger station	In service	In use as the Pereire - Levallois RER C Passenger station		
Courcelles-Ceinture	Passenger station	Destroyed			
Batignolles	Passenger station	In service	Today the Pont-Cardinet station for the Transilien 'L' line		
Avenue de Clichy	Passenger station	Mostly Destroyed	Replaced by the subterrainian Porte de Clichy RER C station		
Avenue de Saint-Ouen	Passenger Station	Not in service	Re-purposed as cultural center.		
Boulevard Ornano	Passenger station	Not in service	Currently a communal flower-vegetable garden and orchard.		
La Chapelle-Saint-Denis	Passenger station	Destroyed			
Est-Ceinture	Passenger station	Destroyed			
Pont de Flandre	Passenger station	Not in service	Reused as private residence, then left derelict for some time, and as of 2017 repurposed as a bar.		
Belleville-Villette	Passenger, Merchandise station	Destroyed			
Paris-Bestiaux	Livestock station	Destroyed	replaced by the Cité des sciences et de l'industrie museum		
Ménilmontant	Passenger station	Destroyed	The track-spanning bridge between station platforms extends the rue de la Mare		
Charonne	Passenger station	Not in Service	Today La Flèche d'Or concert hall		
Charonne-Marchandises	Merchandise station	Destroyed			
Rue Avron	Passenger Station	Not in Service			
Avenue de Vincennes	Passenger Station	Not in Service			
Bel-Air-Ceinture	Passenger station	Destroyed			
Rue Claude Decaen	Passenger Station	Destroyed			
La Rapée-Bercy	Passenger Station	Destroyed	Initially a Merchandise station; Later opened to passengers		
Orléans-Ceinture	Passenger station	Not in service			
Gobelins	Merchandise Station	Partly destroyed, land use presently being debated			
Maison Blanche	Passenger station	Destroyed			
Glacière-Gentilly	Merchandise station	Destroyed			
Parc Montsouris	Passenger station	Destroyed			
Montrouge	Passenger station	Not in service	Currently being renovated		
Ouest-Ceinture	Passenger station	Not in service			
Vaugirard-Abattoirs (Paris-Brancion)	Livestock station	Partly destroyed	Served the Vaugirard slaughterhouses, today the Georges-Brassens park. Some vestiges remain.		
Vaugirard-Ceinture	Passenger station	Not in service			
Grenelle	Passenger station	Destroyed			
Grenelle-Marchandises	Merchandise station	Destroyed	Replaced since 2001 by the Hospital Georges-Pompidou		
