= Du Bousquet locomotive =

Type of steam locomotive

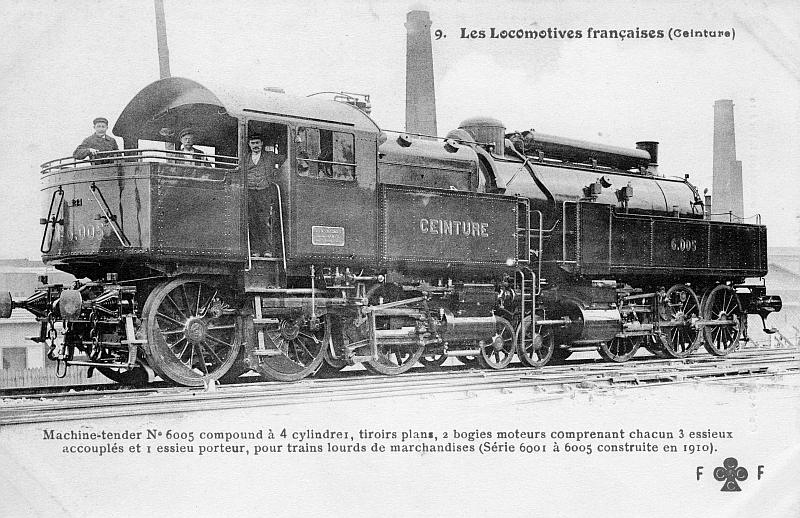
du Bousquet 031+130 Ceinture 6005, 1910.

The du Bousquet locomotive was an unusual design of articulated steam locomotive invented by French locomotive designer Gaston du Bousquet. The design was a tank locomotive, carrying all its fuel and water on board the locomotive proper, and a compound locomotive. The boiler and superstructure were supported upon two swivelling trucks, in a manner similar to a Meyer locomotive.

== Design ==
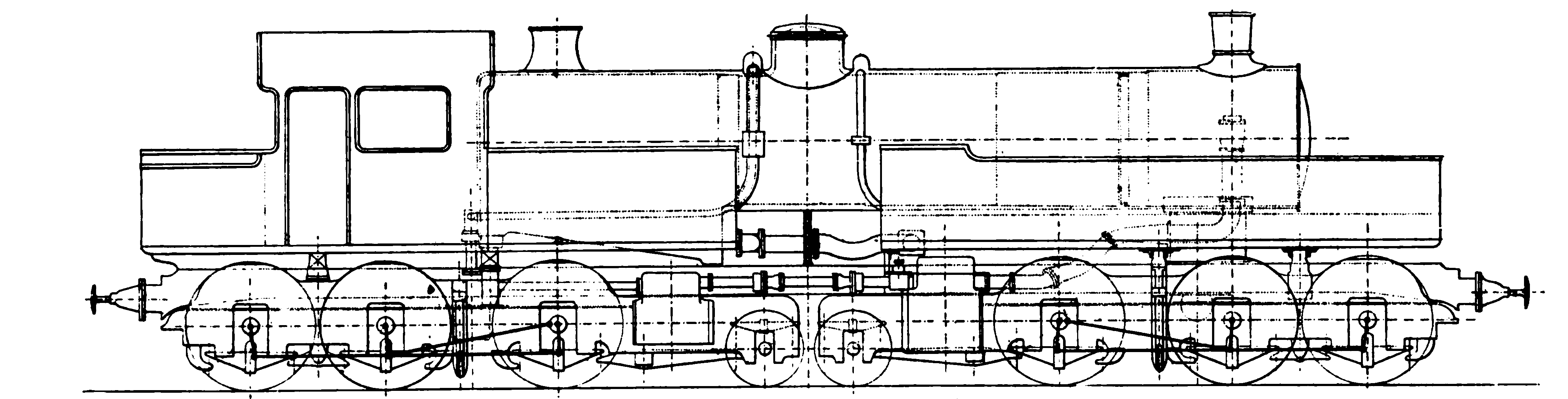
Line drawing of the locomotive design.

The design largely overcame the problems the Meyer design had with poor sealing on the steam-pipe flexible joints by having the rear truck, bearing the high-pressure cylinders, mounted on a bearing that permitted only rotation and not any other axes of flexibility. The steam connection, mounted in the center of this, could seal much more easily since it did not have to allow so much freedom of movement. The front truck, with the low-pressure cylinders, allowed some degree of tilt as well as rotation, and had steam connections from the rear truck with swivelling and telescoping joints to allow freedom of movement.

Also unlike the Meyer, the front set of water tanks were mounted to the moving truck and moved relative to the boiler, somewhat reminiscent of a Garratt locomotive. The tanks above the rear truck, and the rear-mounted fuel bunker, were attached to the boiler and superstructure.

The du Bousquet design had an unusual wheel arrangement; both trucks had six driving wheels and two carrying wheels supporting the cylinders. Unlike many other articulated designs, these carrying wheels were toward the center of the locomotive, as were the cylinders. This arrangement is expressed in the French classification as 031+130, in the Whyte notation as 0-6-2+2-6-0T, or in the UIC classification as (C1′)+(1′C) n4tv.

== French use ==
The du Bousquet design of locomotive saw most success in France, with three railway systems ordering the type; the Chemins de Fer du Nord, the Chemins de fer de l'Est, and the Syndicat des Ceintures (the Outer (Grande Ceinture) and Inner Circle (Petite Ceinture) lines of Paris).

=== Nord ===
The Nord was the first to own the type, appropriately since du Bousquet was their Chief of Motive Power. They constructed 48 units, numbered 6.121 to 6.168, which were painted chocolate brown like all the Nord's compounds and assigned to the Le Bourget and Hirson depots. They worked heavy coal trains. In 1921, however, 34 of the 48 locomotives were transferred to the Grande Ceinture, where they worked until 1935, when the closure of many of the Ceinture lines rendered them surplus. All but one passed to the SNCF in 1938 who renumbered them 2-031+130.TA.1 to 47. They were slowly replaced by the SNCF 151.TQ class, but the last du Bousquet was not withdrawn until 1952.

=== Est ===
The Est built 13 du Bousquet locomotives at their Épernay Works between 1910 and 1911. Numbered 6101 to 6113, these were identical to the Nord locomotives, being constructed from the same plans. All of them were transferred to the Syndicat des Ceintures in 1921, and when the Syndicat was dissolved in 1934 they were leased to the Nord. Eventually they became SNCF 2-031+132.TB.1 to 12.

=== Ceintures ===
In addition to the Nord and Est locomotives reassigned to the Ceintures, that system also acquired 38 du Bousquet locomotives directly, 32 of them from the Société des Batignolles and six constructed by Société anonyme John Cockerill. These locomotives were somewhat more powerful than those of the Nord and the Est, especially after they were upgraded to superheat in the 1920s. These locomotives were transferred to the Chemins de fer de l'État in 1934, and to the SNCF in 1938. The SNCF renumbered them 3-031+130.TA.1 to 36; all withdrawn by 1949.

== Outside France ==
The type saw limited success outside France, being confined to China and Spain.

=== China ===
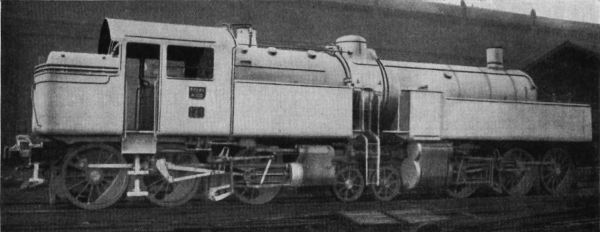
Du Bousquet locomotive of Peking–Hankow Railway

A batch were built for the Peking–Hankow Railway in China; they were almost identical to the French locomotives, and were built by the Belgian companies Forges Usines et Fonderies Haine-Saint-Pierre (four), Société Franco-Belge (six) and Usines Métallurgiques du Hainaut (two).

=== Spain ===
Ten locomotives were built for the Andalusian Railways to the Spanish 5 ft 6 in (1,676 mm) gauge by SA Usines Métallurgiques du Hainaut. Six survived after the founding of RENFE, but were withdrawn by 1947.
