= Nord 2.311 to 2.380 =

Class of French 4-4-0T locomotive

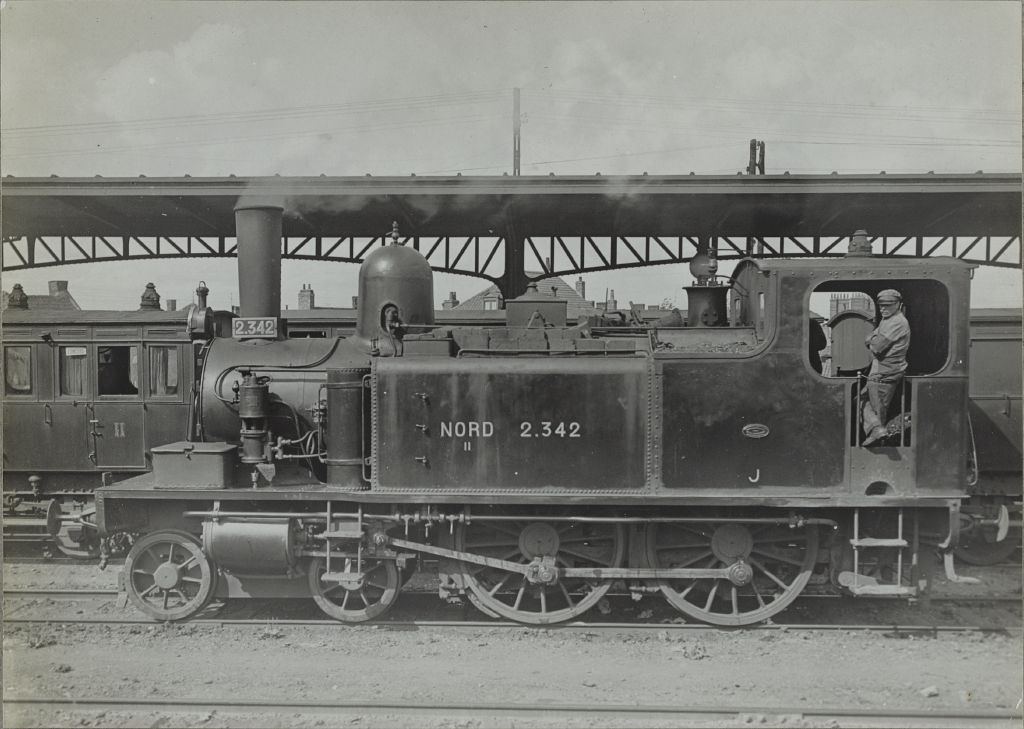
Type and origin
- Power type: Steam
- Build date: 1892–1893
- Total produced: 70
Specifications
- Configuration
  - Whyte: 4-4-0T
  - UIC: 2′B n2t
- Gauge: 1,435 mm (4 ft 8 1/2 in)
- Leading dia.: 900 mm (2 ft 11 3/8 in)
- Driver dia.: 1,664 mm (5 ft 5 1/2 in)
- Wheelbase: 5,525 mm (18 ft 1 1/2 in)
- Length: 9.165 m (30 ft 3/4 in)
- Adhesive weight: 24.88 t (54,900 lb)
- Loco weight: 42.8 t (94,400 lb)
- Fuel type: Coal
- Firebox
  - Type: Belpaire
  - Grate area: 1.57 m^{2} (16.9 sq ft)
- Boiler pressure: 10 kg/cm^{2} (0.981 MPa; 142 psi)
- Heating surface: 85 m^{2} (910 sq ft)
- Cylinders: Two, outside
- Cylinder size: 420 mm × 600 mm (16 9/16 in × 23 5/8 in)
- Valve gear: Stephenson
Performance figures
- Maximum speed: 80 km/h (50 mph)
Career
- Operators: Chemins de Fer du Nord; SNCF
- Numbers: Nord: 2.311 – 2.380; SNCF: 220 TA 1 – 19
- Nicknames: Ravachol

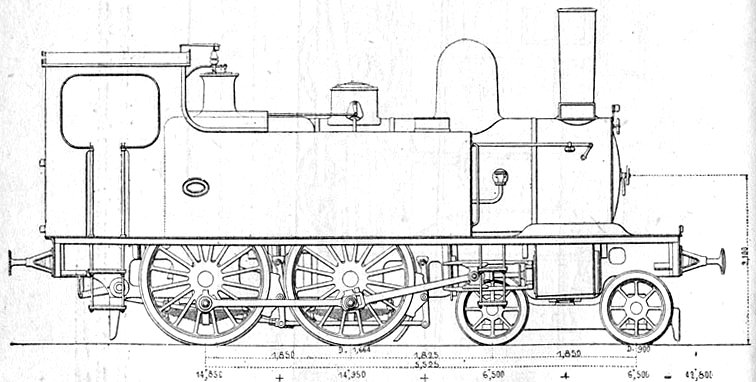
Drawing of the locomotive

Nord 2.311 to 2.380, were 4-4-0T locomotives for suburban passenger traffic of the Chemins de Fer du Nord. The machines were built in 1892–1893. They were nicknamed "Ravachol" because of the entry into service of the series when the latter was arrested in April 1892.

== History ==
The locomotives were put into service starting in 1892 to power services the Nord and Nord-Belge lines. They were numbered 2.311 to 2.380 by the Nord.

The 70 locomotives were built by four companies: Société Alsacienne de Constructions Mécaniques, Société Franco-Belge, Fives-Lille, and Schneider et Cie.

Table of locomotives
Year	Quantity	Manufacturer	Serial number	Nord number
1892	11	SACM-Belfort	4290–4300	2.311–2.321
1893	19	SACM-Belfort	4401–4419	2.322–2.340
1893	5	Société Franco-Belge	957–961	2.341–2.345
1893	10	Fives-Lille	2916–2925	2.346–2.354
1894	5	Fives-Lille	2926–2930	2.355–2.360
1895	20	Schneider et Cie	2580–2599	2.361–2.380

At nationalisation on 1 January 1 1938, the survivors were renumbered 2-220.TA.1 to 2-220.TA.19 by the SNCF.
