= Batignolles tunnel =

Former railway tunnel in Paris, France

Batignolles Tunnel
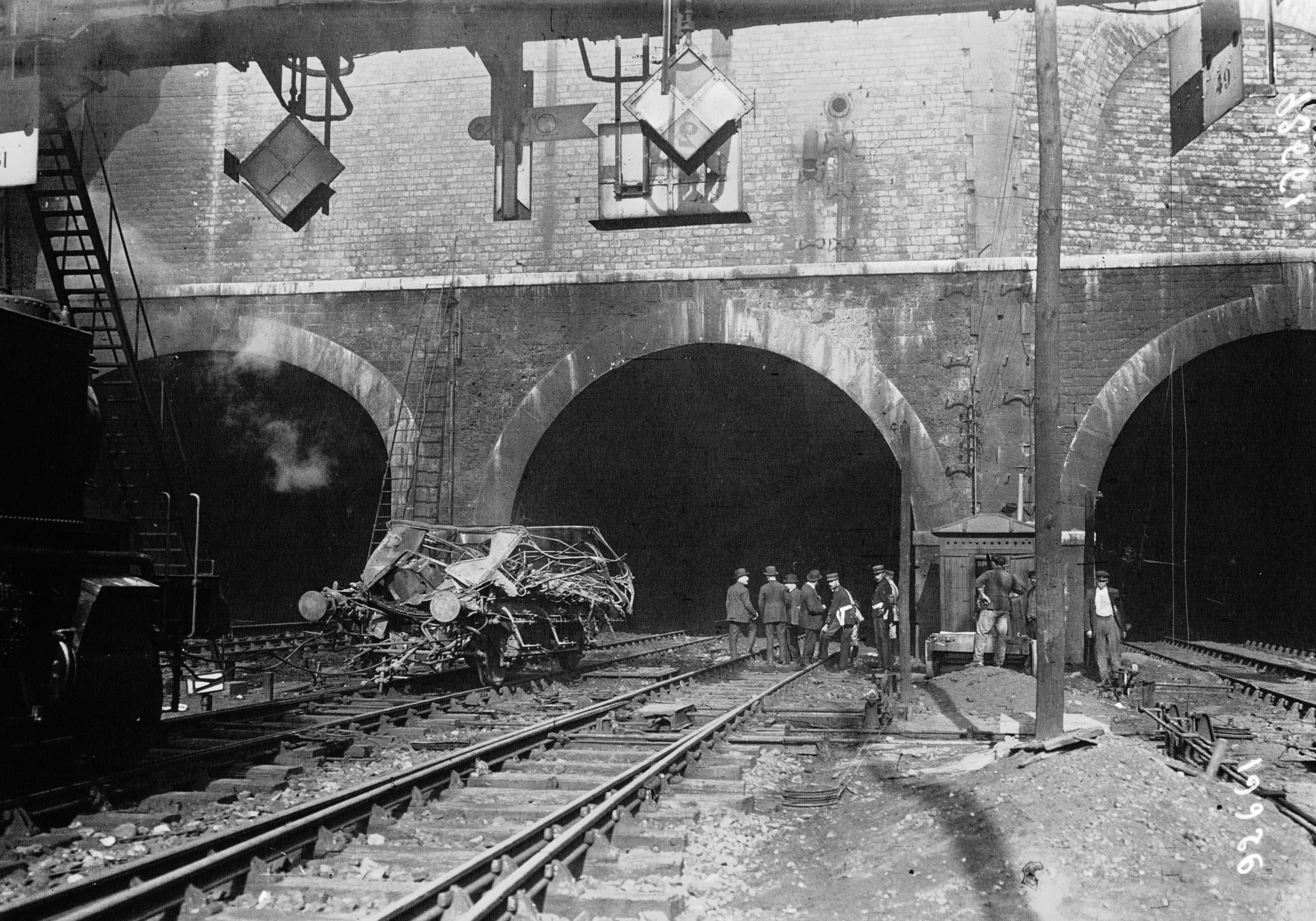
- The entrance to the Batignolles Tunnel galleries after the accident of 5 October 1921.

Overview
- Location: Paris, France
- Coordinates: 48.883207°N 2.319830°E

Operation
- Closed: 1923

Technical
- Length: 321 m (1,053 ft)

Route map
- France Paris 17th arrondissement

The Batignolles Tunnel is a former railway tunnel in Paris, located in the 17th arrondissement of Paris. It lies on the approaches to Gare Saint-Lazare in the Batignolles district and is 321 m (1,053 ft) long.

Constructed in successive phases between 1837 and 1909, it originally consisted of four parallel galleries. Following a railway accident in 1921, most of the tunnel was demolished between 1923 and 1925 and replaced with an open cutting. Only the most recent gallery, located beneath the Rue de Rome, was retained.

== History ==
=== Construction of the galleries ===
In 1837, the Paris–Saint-Germain railway was opened. Leaving the Embarcadère de l'Ouest (Western terminus), then located near the present-day Place de l'Europe, the railway tracks had to pass beneath the commune of Batignolles-Monceau in an area that was already fairly densely populated. The tunnel began just before the Boulevard des Batignolles (then marking the boundary of Paris) and ended beyond the Rue La Condamine, passing beneath the Rue des Dames.

When the Paris–Le Havre railway was built in the early 1840s, a second gallery was excavated., In 1865, a third gallery was constructed to the east of the first two.

During the 1890s, the tunnel was already regarded as an obstacle, and proposals were made for its demolition. However, demolishing the tunnel would have required the demolition of numerous nearby buildings, and the project was abandoned for budgetary reasons., In 1909, a fourth gallery was constructed to the west beneath the Rue de Rome to accommodate the Auteuil line.

=== Demolition of three of the four galleries ===
In 1912, after several years of studies, the management of the Chemins de fer de l'État decided to remove the tunnel's three oldest galleries, retaining only the recently constructed gallery beneath Rue de Rome. A design competition was launched for the project., The project was particularly complex because the work had to be carried out without disrupting either railway traffic or trains on Paris Métro Line 2, which passed directly above the three tunnel galleries. A detailed project, including plans, was approved by ministerial decision on 12 October 1914, but because of the First World War it was never carried out.

=== Railway accident ===
On 5 October 1921, a train departing Gare Saint-Lazare collided with another train ahead of it in the so-called Versailles gallery (the one excavated in 1865). The rupture of the gas reservoir of one of the struck coaches caused a fire in which 28 people died.

As a result, the minister immediately ordered the removal of the three galleries forming the tunnel. The order was confirmed by a ministerial decision dated 5 December 1921. Preparatory work had already begun on 17 October 1921. Demolition of three of the tunnel's galleries—while retaining the gallery beneath the Rue de Rome—began in 1922 and was completed in 1926. The former tunnel and its three galleries were replaced by an open cutting with eight tracks, known as the "Batignolles cutting", compared with the six tracks previously accommodated by the demolished tunnel galleries.

Paris Métro and the Boulevard des Batignolles were subsequently restored, with a steel bridge constructed across the railway cutting.

== Characteristics ==
The tunnel, which originally consisted of four galleries, had the following characteristics:

- length: 321 metres (1,053 ft);
- gallery width:
  - 7.4 metres (24 ft) for galleries No.1 and No.2, known as the Saint-Germain and Argenteuil galleries;
  - 8 metres (26 ft) for gallery No.3, known as the Versailles gallery, where the 1921 accident occurred;
  - 8.5 metres (28 ft) for gallery No.4, known as the Auteuil gallery;
- height of the four vaults: approximately 6 metres (20 ft) above rail level;
- the intrados was located 7 metres (23 ft) below the Rue de Rome.

Originally, five railway lines passed through the tunnel:

- the Paris–Versailles Right Bank railway ("Group II");
- the Paris–Saint-Germain railway ("Group III");
- the Paris–Ermont–Eaubonne railway ("Group IV");
- the Paris–Le Havre railway ("Group V");
- the Paris–Mantes-la-Jolie railway via Conflans-Sainte-Honorine ("Group VI").

Today, only the Group II line continues to use the tunnel, passing through the sole remaining gallery beneath the Rue de Rome.

== See also ==
=== Related articles ===
- Gare Saint-Lazare
- Quartier des Batignolles
- List of rail accidents in France
