= Nord 2.231 to 2.305 =

Nord 2.231 to 2.305 SNCF 2-222.TA
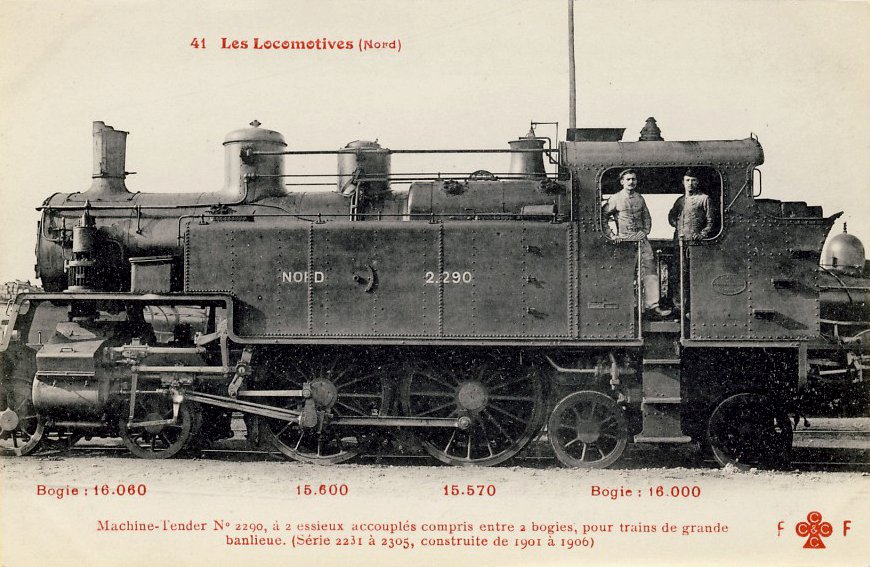
- Nord 2.290 from the second order
Type and origin
- Power type: Steam
- Designer: Gaston du Bousquet
- Builder: La Chapelle Works; Hellemmes Works
- Build date: 1901–1906
- Total produced: 75
Specifications
- Configuration
  - Whyte: 4-4-4T
  - UIC: 2′B2′ n2t
- Gauge: 1,435 mm (4 ft 8 1/2 in)
- Leading dia.: 900 mm (2 ft 11 3/8 in)
- Driver dia.: 1,664 mm (5 ft 5 1/2 in)
- Trailing dia.: 900 mm (2 ft 11 3/8 in)
- Length: 10.884 m (35 ft 8 1/2 in) over buffers
- Adhesive weight: 32.30 tonnes (31.79 long tons; 35.60 short tons)
- Loco weight: 62.99–63.50 tonnes (62.00–62.50 long tons; 69.43–70.00 short tons)
- Fuel type: Coal
- Fuel capacity: 3.0–3.5 tonnes (3.0–3.4 long tons; 3.3–3.9 short tons)
- Water cap.: 6,500–7,000 litres (1,400–1,500 imp gal; 1,700–1,800 US gal)
- Firebox
  - Type: Belpaire
  - Grate area: 1.91 m^{2} (20.6 sq ft)
- Boiler pressure: 12 kg/cm^{2} (1,180 kPa; 171 psi)
- Heating surface: 120.2 m^{2} (1,294 sq ft)
- Superheater: (none)
- Cylinders: Two, outside
- Cylinder size: 430 mm × 600 mm (16 15/16 in × 23 5/8 in)
- Valve gear: Walschaerts
- Valve type: Slide valves
Performance figures
- Maximum speed: 105 km/h (65 mph)
- Tractive effort: 66 kN (15,000 lbf)
Career
- Operators: Chemins de Fer du Nord; SNCF
- Numbers: Nord: 2.231 – 2.305; SNCF 2-222.TA.1 – 2-222.TA.75
- Disposition: All scrapped

Nord 2.231 à 2.305 were suburban 4-4-4T locomotives of the Chemins de Fer du Nord. They were nicknamed "Revolver" due to the appearance of the high-pitched small diameter boilers next to the low water tanks and cabs,

At nationalisation on 1 January 1938, they all passed to the Société nationale des chemins de fer français (SNCF), who renumbered them 2-222.TA.1 to 2-222.TA.75.

== Construction history ==
The locomotives were built in three batches at the Nord's two workshops at La Chapelle, Paris and Hellemmes, Lille.

Batch	Years	Nord No.	SNCF No.	Water	Coal	Weight
1	1901–1902	2.251 – 2.280	2-222.TA.21 – 2.222.TA.50	6500 L	3.0 t	62.9 t
2	1902–1904	2.281 – 2.305	2-222.TA.51 – 2.222.TA.75	7000 L	3.5 t	62.9 t
3	1905–1906	2.250 – 2.231	2-222.TA.20 – 2.222.TA.1	7000 L	3.5 t	63.5 t

== Models ==
The "Revolvers" have been reproduced in HO scale by the British firm DJH Model Loco as a kit with an etched brass chassis and white metal superstructure.

== Notes et references ==
- Davies, John (January 1997). Chemins de fer du Nord Locomotive List 1842–1938. Sunnybank, Queensland: Dr. John Davies. ISBN 0-646-30938-2.
