= Gaston du Bousquet =

Gaston du Bousquet (1839–1910) was a French engineer who was Chief of Motive Power (ingénieur en chef traction) of the Chemin de Fer du Nord, designer of locomotives and professor at École centrale de Lille.

== Steam locomotive designer ==
Gaston du Bousquet taught mechanical engineering at the Institut industriel du Nord de la France (École Centrale de Lille) from 1872. He was appointed chief engineer to the Chemins de Fer du Nord in 1890. He won a gold medal at the Universal Exhibition of 1894. He collaborated successfully with Alfred de Glehn and Edward Beugniot, both working for the Société Alsacienne de Constructions Mécaniques (SACM). He was president of the Society of Civil Engineers of France in 1894.

== Four-cylinder compound locomotives ==
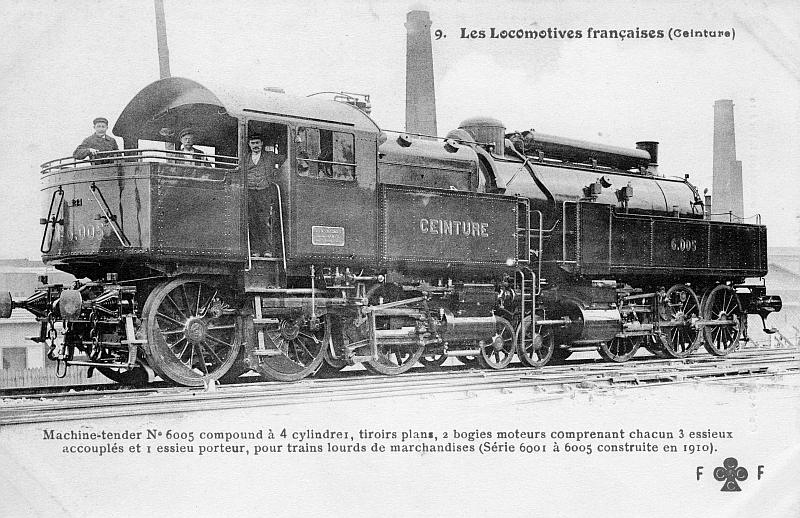
Du Bousquet 031+130 Ceinture 6.005 (Batignoles 1755 of 1910.

He introduced compound (double expansion) steam locomotives to the industrial network with the help of Alfred de Glehn, engineer to SACM.

du Bousquet locomotives

- Nord 6.121 to 6.168, 28 loaned to the Ceinture, later SNCF 1-031+130.TA.1 to 47
- Ceinture 6.001 to 6.038, later SNCF 3-031+130.TA.1 to 36

He designed among other locomotives:

- Nord 2.121 to 2.180 “Chocolat” 4-4-0s of 1891–1898
- Nord 2.231 to 2.305 “Revolver” 4-4-4Ts of 1901–1906; later SNCF 2-222.TA
- Nord 2.311 to 2.380 “Ravachol” 4-4-0Ts of 1892–1895; later SNCF 2-220.TA
- Nord 2.641 to 2.675 Atlantics (4-4-2) of 1900–1902, later SNCF 2-221.A
- Nord 2.741 Prototype Atlantic of 1907; rebuilt as 4-4-4, rebuilt as 4-6-0 No. 3.999
- Nord 3.081 to 3.302 4-6-0s of 1897–1910; later SNCF 2-230.A
- Nord 3.121 to 3.122 “Metropolitan” 0-6-4Ts of 1892–1893
- Nord 3.513 to 3.537 4-6-0s of 1908–1910; later SNCF 2-230.D.1 to 149
- Nord 3.801 to 3.860 “Bleriot” 4-6-4Ts of 1909–1910; later SNCF 2-232.TA
- Nord 3.1101 and 3.1102 Prototype Baltics (4-6-4 of 1911; the death of the designer prevented development.

Business positions
Preceded by Edouard Delebecque	Ingénieur en chef traction of the Chemins de Fer du Nord	Succeeded by Georges Asselin
