= 1837 in rail transport =

This article lists events related to rail transport that occurred in 1837.

== Events ==
=== April events ===
- April 3 – The Paisley and Renfrew Railway is opened in Scotland, a 4 ft 6 in gauge railway providing passenger services hauled by steam locomotives.
- April 18 – Andover and Wilmington Railroad reorganizes and changes its name to Andover and Haverhill Railroad, reflecting plans to extend its line to Haverhill, Massachusetts.
- April 24 – The Leipzig-Dresdner Eisenbahn, the first major railway line to be built between important cities in Germany, begins passenger operations. It orders locomotive Columbus from Ross Winans, the first exported from the United States.

=== July events ===
- July 4 – The Grand Junction Railway, the first trunk railway to be completed in Britain is opened from Birmingham to Warrington, England (82 mi (132 km)), where it connects with other lines.

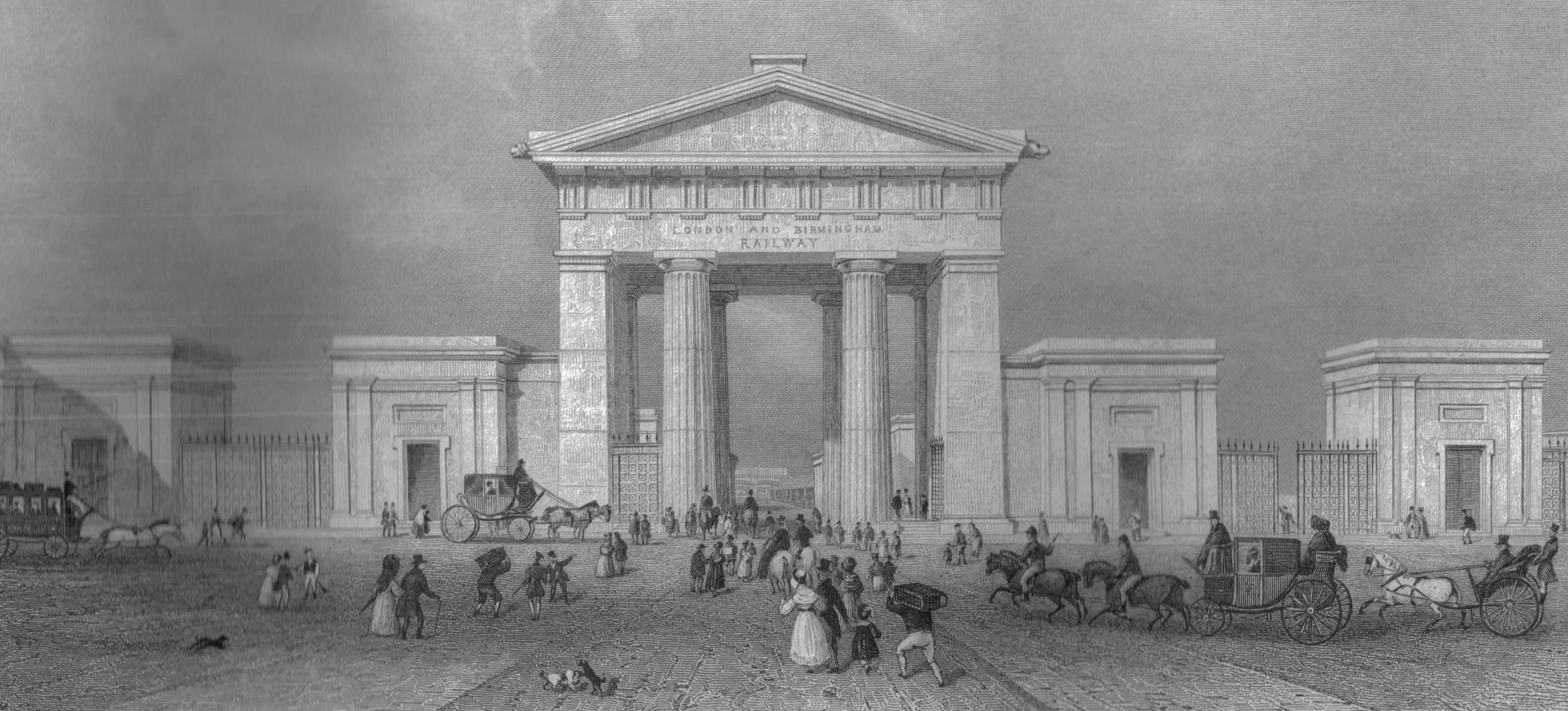
The ‘Euston Arch’ (engraving by Radclyffe).

- July 15 – The Glasgow, Paisley, Kilmarnock and Ayr and Glasgow, Paisley and Greenock Railways are authorised in Scotland.
- July 20 – Euston station is opened as the first London terminus.

=== August events ===
- August 24 – Queen Marie Amélie and King Louis-Philippe officially open first section of the Paris–Saint-Germain-en-Laye line, the first steam-worked passenger railway in France.

=== October events ===
- October 30 – The Tsarskoye Selo Railway, the first in the Russian Empire, between Saint Petersburg Tsarskoselsky station and Zarskoje Selo with a length of 23 km (14 mi), opens, engineered by Franz Anton von Gerstner. The locomotive for the new railway was built by Englishman Timothy Hackworth and the gauge is 1829 mm (6 ft). Because the track connected the pleasure sites of the nobility, it was called "the train to the pub."

=== November events ===
- November 10 – Opening of first railroad in Cuba (and the Spanish Empire), Havana–Güines, principally for sugar traffic.
- November 23 – Opening of first railroad in Austria, the Kaiser Ferdinands Nordbahn, Vienna–Floridsdorf–Deutsch-Wagram (17.7 km).

=== Unknown date events ===
- Rogers, Ketchum and Grosvenor receives the company's first order for new steam locomotives; the order for two locomotives is placed by the Mad River and Lake Erie Railroad and is intended to be the beginning of the railroad's locomotive fleet.
- Scottish inventor Robert Davidson produces a model battery-electric locomotive.

== Births ==
=== April births ===
- April 17 – J. P. Morgan, American financier who helped to finance United States Steel Corporation (d. 1913).

=== May births ===
- May 6 – William Barstow Strong, president of the Atchison, Topeka and Santa Fe Railway 1881–1889 (d. 1914).
- May 23 – Anatole Mallet, inventor of the Mallet locomotive type (d. 1919).

=== June births ===
- June 25 – Charles Tyson Yerkes, American financier of rapid transit systems in Chicago and London (d. 1905).

=== September births ===
- September 26 – Allen Manvel, president of the Atchison, Topeka and Santa Fe Railway 1889–1893 (d. 1893).

== Deaths ==
=== March deaths ===
- March 11 – William James, English railway promoter (b. 1771).
