= Chemins de fer du Nord =

Railway company in northern France (1845–1937)

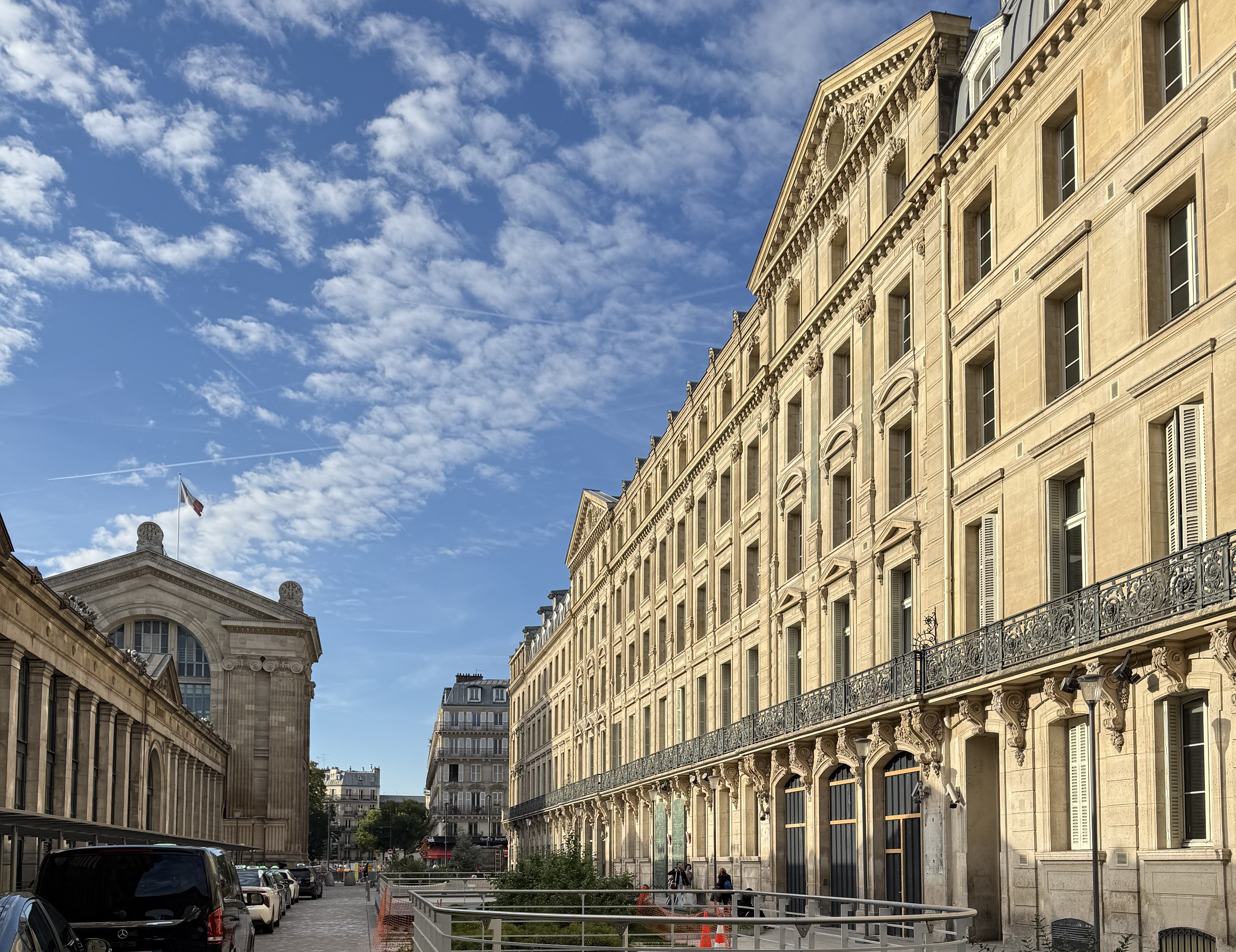
Former head office of the Chemins de Fer du Nord in Paris (right), with the Gare du Nord in the background

The Chemins de fer du Nord (French: Compagnie des chemins de fer du Nord [kɔ̃paɲi de ʃəmɛ̃ də fɛʁ dy nɔʁ] or CF du Nord; English: Northern Railway Company) often referred to simply as the Nord company, was a rail transport company founded in September 1845 in Paris. It was owned by, among others, de Rothschild Frères of France, N M Rothschild & Sons of London, Charles Laffitte and Edward Blount, and Baron Jean–Henri Hottinguer. Baron James de Rothschild served as the company's president from its inception until his death in 1868.

== History ==
A royal ordnance, dated 10 September 1845, granted the CF du Nord a concession to build a railway from Paris to Valenciennes and Lille, with branch lines to Dunkirk and Calais, and lines from Creil to Saint-Quentin and Fampoux to Hazebrouck. From the Gare du Nord, the station the company built in Paris, the Paris–Lille railway led north towards Belgium, connecting to Amiens, Douai and Lille in 1846, with a branch line from Douai to Valenciennes. Lille and Valenciennes had already been connected to the Belgian railway network in 1842. The new line made it possible to travel by train from Paris to Brussels and further.

The network was rapidly expanded in the following years:

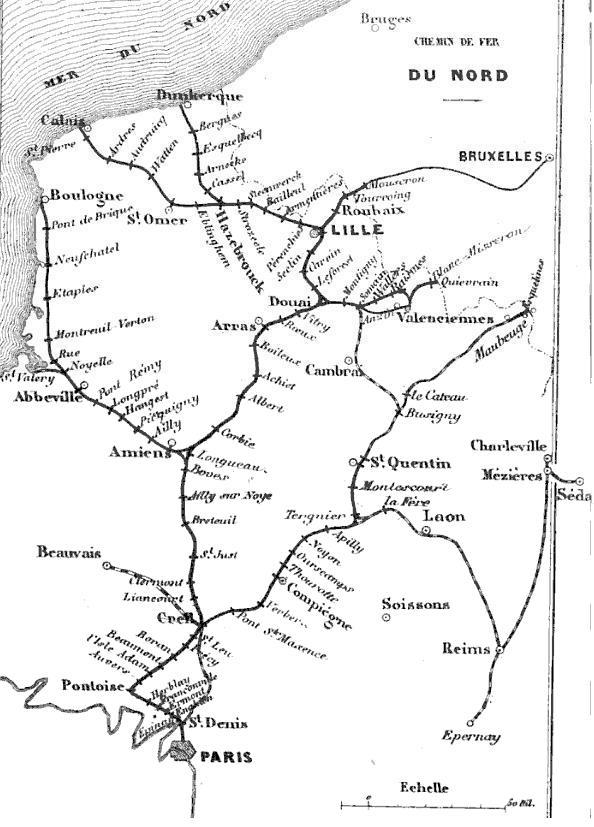
The Nord network in 1853

Railway line	Opened
Paris–Lille railway	1846–1859
Douai–Valenciennes railway	1846
Longueau–Boulogne railway	1847–1848
Creil–Jeumont railway	1847–1855
Lille–Fontinettes railway	1848–1849
Arras–Dunkirk railway	1848–1862
Amiens–Laon railway	1857–1867
Creil–Beauvais railway	1857
Hautmont–Mons railway	1858
Chemin de Fer de la Somme	1858
Busigny–Somain railway	1858
Paris–Hirson railway	1860–1871
Lens–Ostricourt railway	1860
Chantilly–Crépy-en-Valois railway	1862–1870
Lille–Tournai railway	1865
Boulogne–Calais railway	1867
Rouen–Amiens railway	1867

=== Competition ===
The potential for expansion of the CF du Nord territory was limited by other companies: the Chemins de fer de l'Ouest to its south-west, and the Chemins de fer de l'Est to its east. By opening a line from Paris to Hirson via Soissons and Laon from 1860 to 1871, the CF du Nord protected its eastern border against CF de l'Est expansion. The concession for the line from Creil to Beauvais, owned by CF de l'Est predecessor Chemins de fer des Ardennes, was exchanged for the Nord's concession for Laon–Reims in 1855.

In 1937, the CF du Nord was nationalised, as were the other main railway companies, to become part of the Société nationale des chemins de fer français (SNCF).

== Activity ==
In 1926, in conjunction with the British Southern Railway, the CF du Nord began running a regular luxury passenger train, Golden Arrow/Fleche d'Or, from London to Paris. Four containers were used to transport of passengers' baggage. These containers were loaded in London or Paris and carried to the ports of Dover or Calais, on flat cars in the UK, and "CIWL Pullman Golden Arrow Fourgon of CIWL" in France.

== In the arts ==
In 1855, Baron Rothschild commissioned photographer Edouard Baldus to take a series of photographs of the various landmarks on the railway line between Boulogne-sur-Mer and Paris. The photographs were used to create an album for Queen Victoria and Prince Albert, as a souvenir of their visit to France that year. The album can be seen in the photographic collection in the Royal Archives at Windsor Castle.
