= 2-8-2 =

Locomotive wheel arrangement

2-8-2 (Mikado)

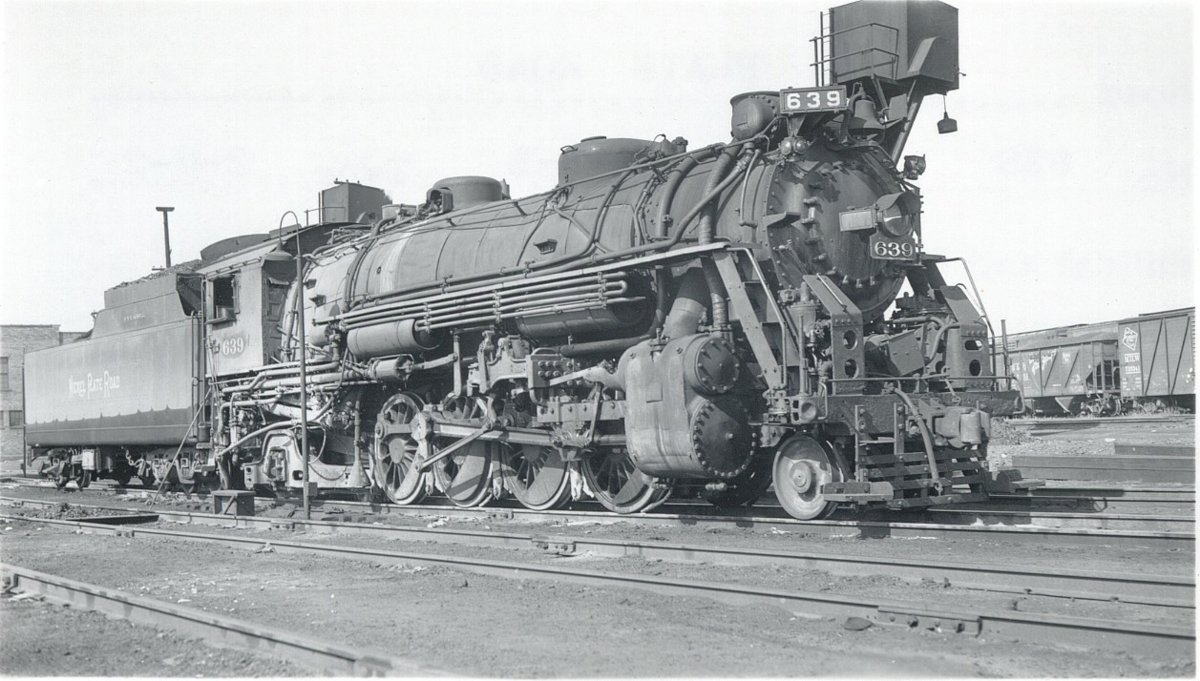
- USRA Light Mikado No. 639 from the Nickel Plate Road
Equivalent classifications
- UIC class: 1D1, 1'D1'
- French class: 141
- Turkish class: 46
- Swiss class: 4/6
- Russian class: 1-4-1
First known tank engine version
- First use: 1884
- Country: Australia
- Locomotive: 8D15 class
- Railway: Queensland Railways
- Builder: Dübs & Co.
- Evolved from: 2-8-0
- Evolved to: 2-8-4
- Benefits: Larger coal bunker.
First known tender engine version
- First use: 1884
- Country: United States of America
- Locomotive: Calumet
- Railway: Chicago & Calumet Terminal Railway
- Evolved from: 2-8-0, 2-6-2
- Evolved to: 2-8-4, 2-10-2
- Benefits: Larger firebox aft of drivers
First known "True type" version
- First use: 1867
- Country: United States
- Locomotive: No. 82 Bee
- Railway: Lehigh Valley
- Designer: Alexander Mitchell
- Builder: Norris Locomotive Works
- Evolved from: 2-10-0
- Benefits: Better stability on tight curves

Under the Whyte notation for the classification of steam locomotives, 2-8-2 represents the wheel arrangement of two leading wheels on one axle, usually in a leading truck, eight powered and coupled driving wheels on four axles and two trailing wheels on one axle, usually in a trailing truck. This configuration of steam locomotive is most often referred to as a Mikado, after the first 2-8-2 built by Baldwin Locomotive Works in 1893 for Nihon Tetsudo (Japan Railways). The configuration is commonly shortened to Mike.

It was also at times referred to on some railroads in the United States as the McAdoo Mikado and, during World War II, they were called MacArthur Mikados.

The notation 2-8-2T indicates a tank locomotive of this wheel arrangement, the "T" suffix indicating a locomotive on which the water is carried in tanks mounted on the engine rather than in an attached tender.

== Overview ==
The 2-8-2 wheel arrangement allowed the locomotive's firebox to be placed behind instead of above the driving wheels, thereby allowing a larger firebox that could be both wide and deep. This supported a greater rate of combustion and thus a greater capacity for steam generation, allowing for more power at higher speeds. Allied with the larger driving wheel diameter which was possible when they did not impinge on the firebox, it meant that the 2-8-2 was capable of higher speeds than a 2-8-0 with a heavy train. These locomotives did not suffer from the imbalance of reciprocating parts as much as did the 2-6-2 or the 2-10-2, because the center of gravity was between the second and third drivers instead of above the centre driver.

The first 2-8-2 locomotive was built in 1884. It was originally named Calumet by Angus Sinclair, in reference to the 2-8-2 engines built for the Chicago & Calumet Terminal Railway (C&CT). However, this name did not take hold.

The wheel arrangement name "Mikado" originated from a group of Japanese type 9700 2-8-2 locomotives that were built by Baldwin Locomotive Works for the 3 ft 6 in (1,067 mm) gauge Nippon Railway of Japan in 1897. In the 19th century, the Emperor of Japan was often referred to as "the Mikado" in English. The Gilbert and Sullivan opera, The Mikado, set in Japan, had premiered in 1885 and achieved great popularity in both Britain and America.

The 2-8-2 was one of the more common configurations in the first half of the 20th century, before dieselisation. Between 1917 and 1944, nearly 2,200 of this type were constructed by Baldwin, the American Locomotive Company (ALCO) and the Lima Locomotive Works, based on designs by the United States Railroad Administration (USRA). It was also known as the "McAdoo Mikado" in the United States, after William Gibbs McAdoo who was appointed as Director General of Railroads when the United States commenced hostilities during the latter part of the First World War and the USRA was established. Of all of the USRA designs, the Mikado proved to be the most popular. The total American production was about 14,000, of which 9,500 were for local customers and the rest exported.

"Mikado" remained the type name until the attack on Pearl Harbor in 1941. Seeking a more American name, "MacArthur", after General Douglas MacArthur, came into use to describe the locomotive type in the United States. After the war, the type name "Mikado" again became the most common for that locomotive type.

== Usage ==
Locomotives of this wheel arrangement saw service on all six populated continents. The 2-8-2 type was particularly popular in North America, but was also used extensively in Continental Europe and elsewhere.

=== Argentina ===
==== 1,676 mm (5 ft 6 in) broad gauge ====
The Buenos Aires and Pacific Railway bought eighteen 2-8-2T locomotives in three batches of six as their class 701 class. The first two batches came from North British Locomotive Company in 1908 and 1912, the third from Henschel & Son in 1913.

The BA&P also bought eight 2-8-2 tender locomotives from Beyer, Peacock & Company in 1928 as their 3001 class.

The Central Argentine Railway (FCCA) bought fifteen 2-8-2T locomotives as their class C7 in 1912; they were built by Robert Stephenson & Company with works numbers 3506 to 3520.

The FCCA also bought sixty 2-8-2 locomotives: twenty class CS8A from Beyer, Peacock & Company in 1926, and another twenty in 1928 from Robert Stephenson & Company. The final twenty to class CS9A were supplied by Vulcan Foundry in 1930. Both classes were cross-compound locomotives with one high-pressure cylinder with a bore of 21 inches (533 millimetres) and one low-pressure cylinder with a bore of 31 1/2 inches (800 millimetres), with a stroke of 26 inches (660 millimetres). The earlier class had coupled wheels with a diameter of 62 inches (1,575 millimetres), whereas on the later class they were 55 1/2 inches (1,410 millimetres).

==== Standard gauge ====
The East Argentine Railway bought four 2-8-2 locomotives from Baldwin Locomotive Works in 1924. As class X they were numbered 70 to 74; they became General Urquiza Railway 701 to 704 in the 1948 nationalisation. Baldwin had classified them as 12-30-1/4-E.

==== 1,000 mm (3 ft 3 3/8 in) gauge ====
The Province of Buenos Aires Railway bought a single 2-8-2 locomotive from Hanomag of Germany in 1910. Numbered 251 and classified as class E, it was the only 2-8-2 on that railway's system.

The Central Northern Railway (FCCN) bought seven classes of 2-8-2 locomotives totalling 134 locomotives. The first 100 were all bought in 1911: Fifteen from Borsig (class C7, numbered 700–714), 25 from Henschel & Sohn (class C8, 715–739), 10 from Hanomag (class C9, 740–749) and 50 from North British Locomotive (class C10, 750–799). The next 25 came from Baldwin Locomotive Works in 1920; they were Baldwin class 12-30-1/4-E, 55 to 79, FCCN class C11, numbered 7000–7024. The last nine new locomotives were built by Henschel between 1928 and 1930 (class C13, numbers 7025–7033, and class C13A, number 7034). In addition the FCCN rebuilt 20 4-8-0 locomotives of classes C6 and C7 into 2-8-2s between 1938 and 1940.

The Córdoba Central Railway (FCCC) bought 31 locomotives in four classes. The first was a solitary locomotive, numbered 800, class C6A built by Alco's Brooks Works in 1910. It was nearly a decade before they bought any more with a dozen class C9A locomotives, numbered 1451 to 1462, coming from Montreal Locomotive Works, half in 1919 and half in 1920. MLW delivered another 15 Mikados later that same year; as class C10A they were numbered 1463 to 1477. FCCC's final three came from Baldwin Locomotive Works in 1925, they were Baldwin class 12-26-1/4-E; FCCC numbered them 1501 to 1503, class C11A. When the FCCC was taken over by the FCCN in 1939, their new owner changed the classification by adding 20 to the FCCC's old classification; the locomotives kept their old numbers, except for FCCC 800 which became FCCN 1400.

==== 750 mm (2 ft 5 1/2 in) gauge ====
On the Ferrocarriles Patagónicos, 75 locomotives were bought in 1922. Fifty were built by Henschel & Sohn, numbered 101 to 150 and class 75H; 25 were built by Baldwin, numbered 1 to 25, class 75B with Baldwin classifying then as 12-18-1/4-E.

=== Australia ===
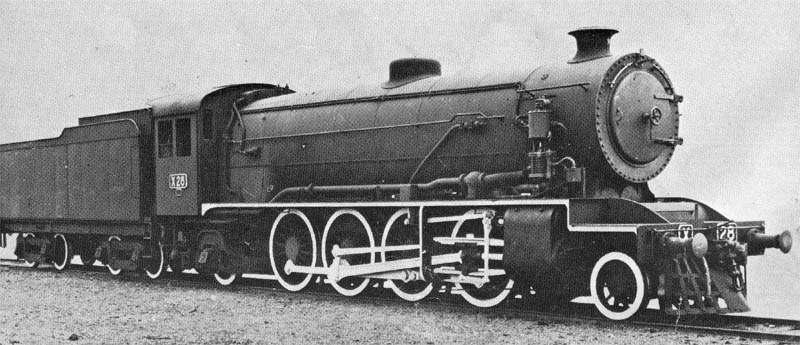
Australian gauge-convertible X class

One of the world's first 2-8-2T designs was the South Maitland Railways 10 Class, first delivered in 1911, by Beyer, Peacock & Company, and spasmodically continuing delivery until 1925, then totaling 14 in the class.

The requirement for locomotives that could be converted from 5 ft 3 in (1,600 mm) to 4 ft 8 1/2 in (1,435 mm) standard gauge without major re-engineering led to the introduction of Mikado locomotives by the Victorian Railways in the 1920s. Whereas previous 2-8-0 Consolidation type locomotives featured long, narrow fireboxes between the frames that made gauge conversion impractical, the N class light lines and X class heavy goods locomotives both featured wide fireboxes positioned behind the coupled wheels and above the frames.

The South Australian Railways (SAR) employed four distinct classes of 2-8-2 locomotive, the locally designed 700 and 710 class, the 740 class that was originally built for China by Clyde Engineering and purchased by the SAR after the order was cancelled in the wake of the Chinese Communist Revolution. The 750 class was a group of ten surplus VR N class locomotives.

To assist with the postwar rebuilding of Australian railways, American-designed Mikado locomotives were also introduced after World War II, such as the Baldwin Locomotive Works built New South Wales Government Railways D59 class and the Queensland Rail AC16 class.

A Mikado was also the last new class of mainline steam locomotive to be introduced in Australia, the Western Australian Government Railways V class heavy freight locomotives of 1955.

=== Austria ===
The 4-cylinder compound class 470, developed in 1914 by Karl Gölsdorf, was built for express trains on mountain lines. From 1927, some of these locomotives were rebuilt to two-cylinder superheated steam locomotives and designated class 670. They were reclassified to class 39 from 1938 and remained in service until 1957.

=== Belgian Congo ===
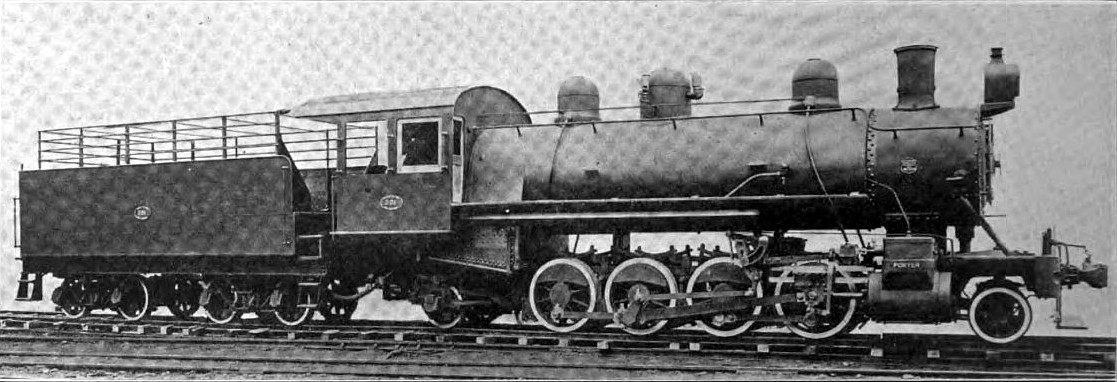
Katanga Mikado no. 201, c. 1917

In 1917, 24 Mikado type steam locomotives were built for the Compagnie du chemin de fer du bas-Congo au Katanga (BCK), a new line from the Northern Rhodesian border to Port Francqui in the Belgian Congo. Since the line was just being completed at the time, the full complement of locomotives were not required immediately and four, possibly six, of them were temporarily leased to the South African Railways to alleviate a wartime shortage of locomotives. In South Africa, they were known as the Katanga Mikado. Six more of these engines were leased to the Beira and Mashonaland and Rhodesia Railways (BMR), which operated between Umtali in Southern Rhodesia and Beira in Mozambique. The locomotives were all forwarded to the Belgian Congo after the war, where they were numbered in the BCK range from 201 to 224.

=== Canada ===
Canadian National (CN) operated a few Mikado locomotives:

- One locomotive in the R-1 class, number 3000.
- Thirty locomotives in the R-2 class, numbered 300 to 329.
- Several locomotives in the S-1 and S-4 classes, numbered in the range between 3200-3524 and 3198-3199 and 3525-3599 and 3700-3757 and 3800-3805 .

Canadian Pacific (CP) used Mikado locomotives for passenger and freight trains throughout Canada. Most worked in the Rocky Mountains, where the standard 4-6-2 Pacifics and 4-6-4 Hudsons could not provide enough traction to handle the steep mountain grades.

The Temiskaming & Northern Ontario (renamed Ontario Northland Railway in 1946) operated seventeen Mikados, all ordered from Canadian Locomotive Company in three batches, the first six in 1916, second batch of four in 1921, and the final seven in 1923 to 1925. They were scrapped between 1955 and 1957 when the Ontario Northland was completely dieselized, except for three wrecked and scrapped in the 1940s. The Temiskaming & Northern Ontario operated its Mikados on both freight and passenger service, and were fitted with smoke deflectors. In 1946 65 out of 199 Canadian Pacific N2 2-8-0's were rebuilt and converted to Class P1n 2-8-2's . However all were scrapped around 1955 and 1958 . No P1n 2-8-2's were preserved however CP no . 5468 is preserved

CP's no. 5468, on display in Revelstoke, British Columbia. And CP's 5361 a Class P2e is preserved Depew New York.

=== China ===
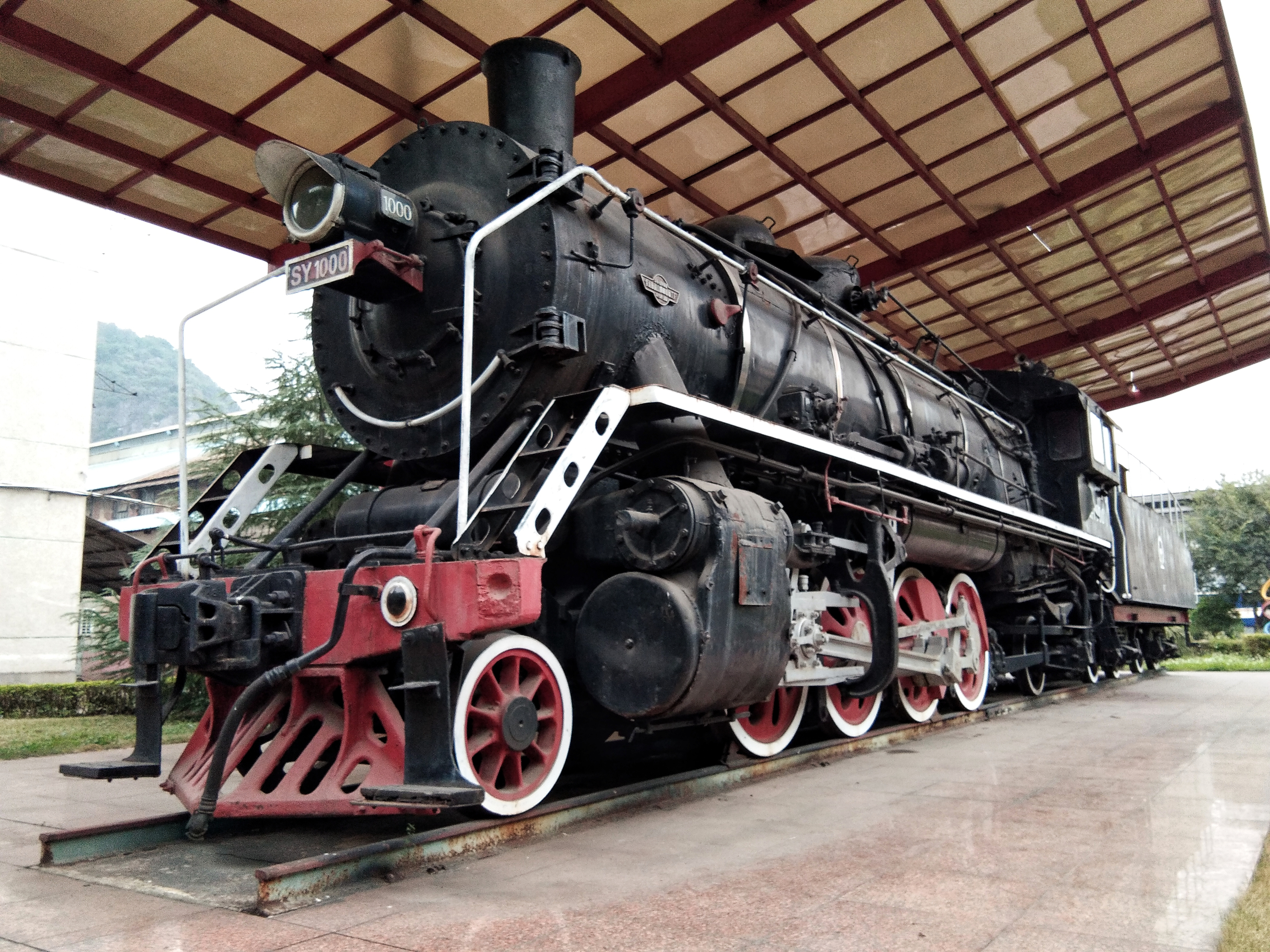
China Railways SY no. 1000

Some local industries still actively use Mikados on freight service. The last regular Mikado passenger service was ended on 20 November 2015 in Baiyin. A few Chinese-made locomotives have found their way into the United States, including Class SY no. 3025, built in 1989, which operated as New Haven no. 3025, in honor of Class J1 no. 3001-3024, on the Valley Railroad in Connecticut. The locomotive now operates on the Belvidere & Delaware as no. 142. It is original to the New York, Susquehanna & Western Railway as no. 142. It and two other Chinese 2-8-2s are currently in the United States.

=== Finland ===
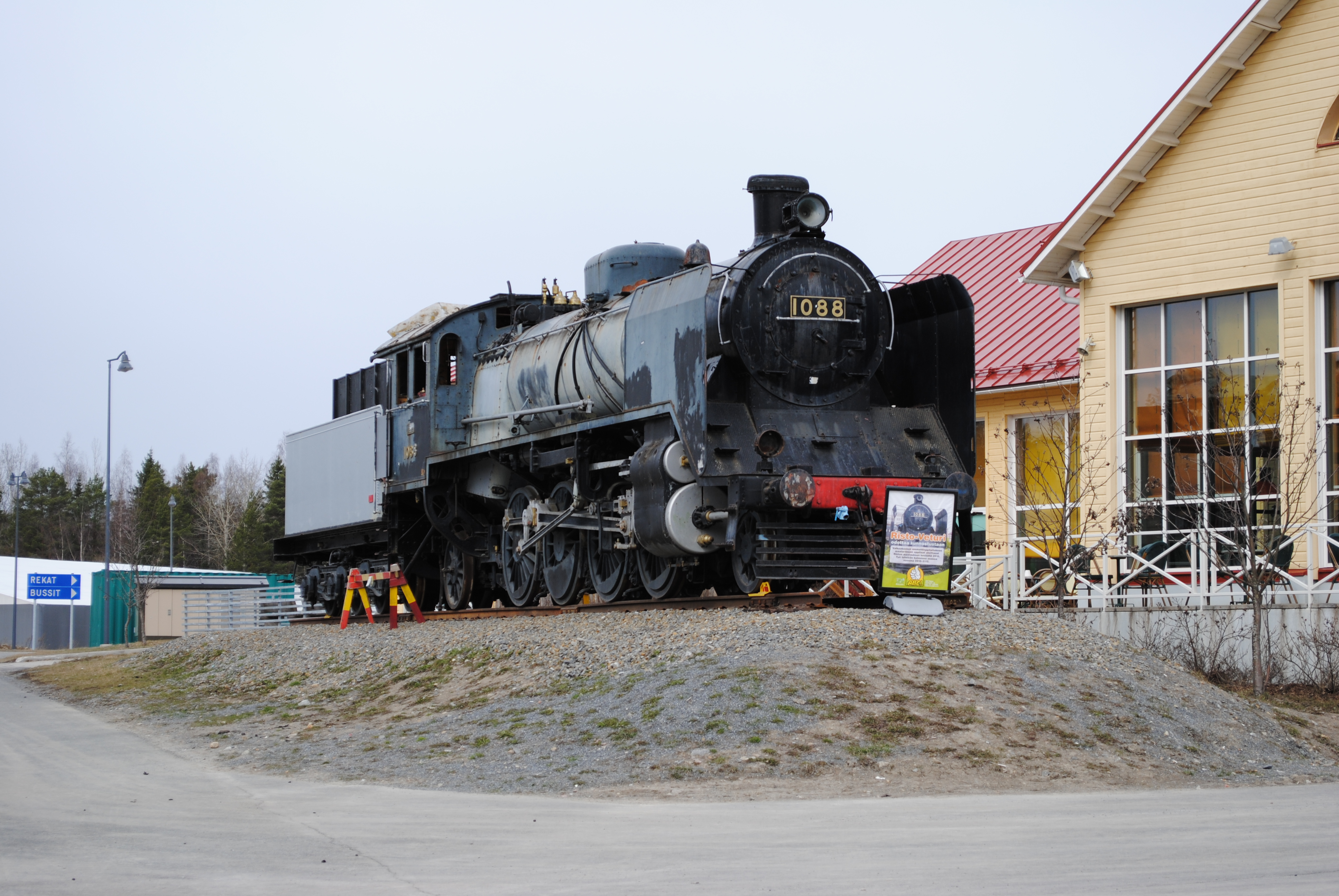
Class Tr1 no. 1088

Finland's sixteen 5 ft (1,524 mm) gauge Class Pr1 were 2-8-2T passenger locomotives for use on local trains. They were nicknamed Paikku, which means local. The Class Pr1 was operational from 1924 to 1972. Numbered 761 to 776, they were built by Hanomag in Germany and also by Finnish locomotive builders Tampella and Lokomo. The last one, no. 776, is preserved at the Finnish Railway Museum.

The Finnish Class Tr1 (or R1) tender locomotive was built by Tampella, Lokomo and German locomotive builders Arnold Jung from 1940 and remained in service until 1975. They were numbered from 1030 to 1096 and were nicknamed Risto, after Finnish President Risto Ryti. 1030, 1033, 1037, 1047, 1051, 1055, 1057, 1060, 1067, 1071, 1074, 1077, 1082, 1087, 1088, 1092, 1093, 1094, 1095 and 1096 are preserved. They were primarily used on hauling heavy freight trains on main lines. Tr1 has been the second heaviest freight steam locomotive in VR service, outweighed only by the American-built Class Tr2 "Truman" 2-10-0 engines.

=== France ===
France used a fairly large number of 2-8-2s in both tender and tank configurations, designated 141 class from the French classification system of wheel arrangements.

==== Tender locomotives ====
Of the pre-nationalisation railway companies that existed before the formation of the SNCF, the Chemins de fer de Paris à Lyon et à la Méditerranée (PLM) had the most Mikados. Their first twelve were initially numbered from 1001 to 1012 and later renumbered to 141.A.1 to 141.A.12. The PLM's second series, numbered from 1013 to 1129 and later renumbered 141.B.1 to 141.B.117, were built by Baldwin Locomotive Works in the United States. Their third and largest class was numbered from 141.C.1 to 141.C.680. Of these latter locomotives, those fitted with feedwater heaters bore the class letter D. The PLM also rebuilt forty-four 141.C and 141.D class locomotives to 141.E class. The SNCF modified the PLM numbers by adding the regional prefix digit "5".

The PLM's 141.A class Mikados were copied by the Chemins de fer du Nord, who had fifty, numbered from 4.1101 to 4.1150, which became 2-141.A.1 to 2-141.A.50 on the SNCF.

The Chemins de fer de l'État also had a class of 250 Mikados, numbered from 141-001 to 141-250. These later became the 141.B class on the SNCF and were renumbered 3-141.B.1 to 3-141.B.250. After modifications, the 141.B class locomotives became the 141.C class, as well as one 141.D class (no. 141.D.136) and one 141.E class (no. 141.E.113). No. 3-141.C.100 has been preserved and designated a Monument historique.

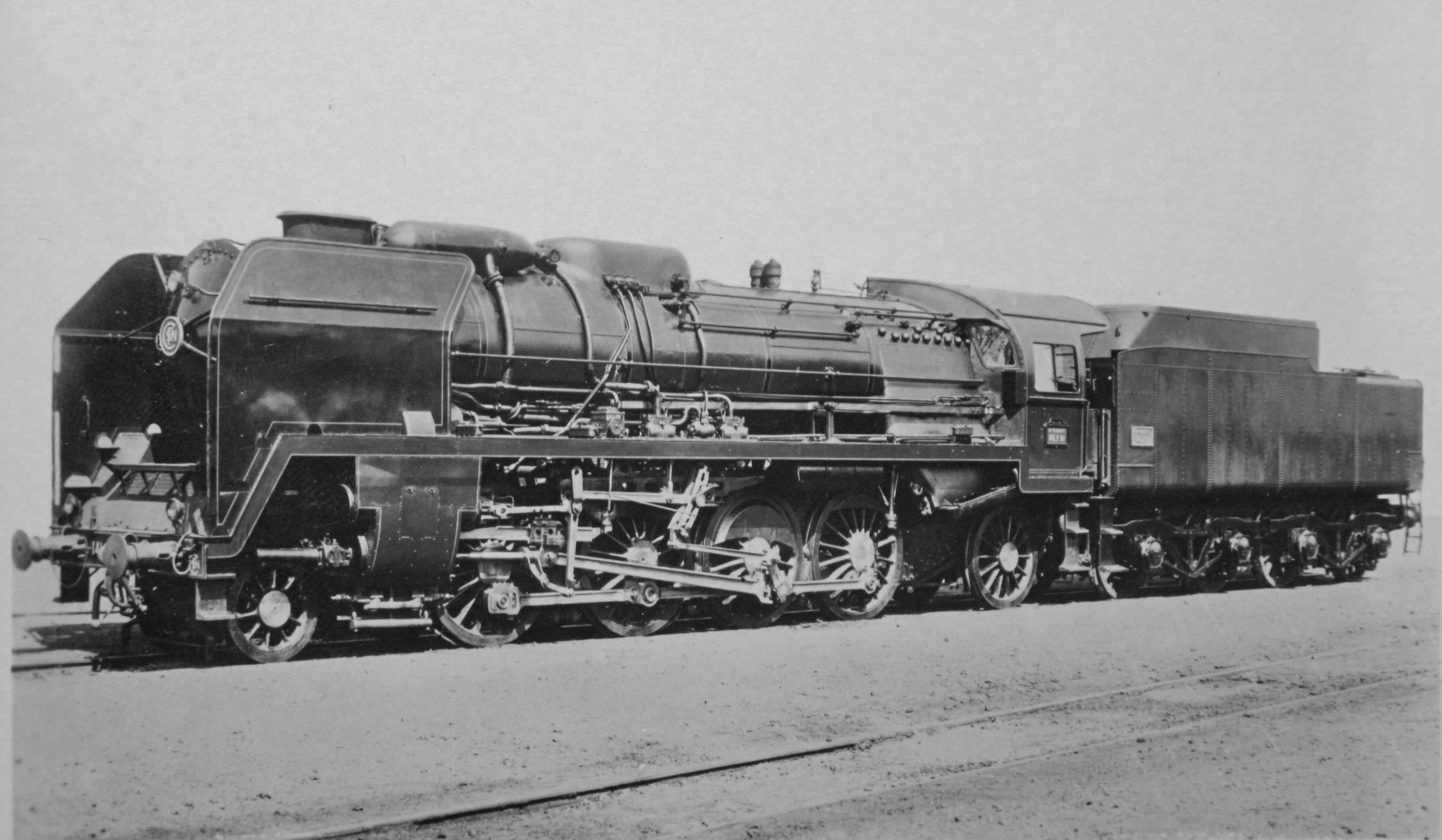
SNCF 141P Class

The most powerful French Mikado was the SNCF 141.P class. At about 3,300 horsepower (2,500 kilowatts), these engines were among the most efficient steam locomotives in the world, thanks to their compound design. They could burn 30% less fuel and use 40% less water than their 141.R class counterparts, but could not compete when it came to reliability. Every locomotive of this 318-strong class has been scrapped.

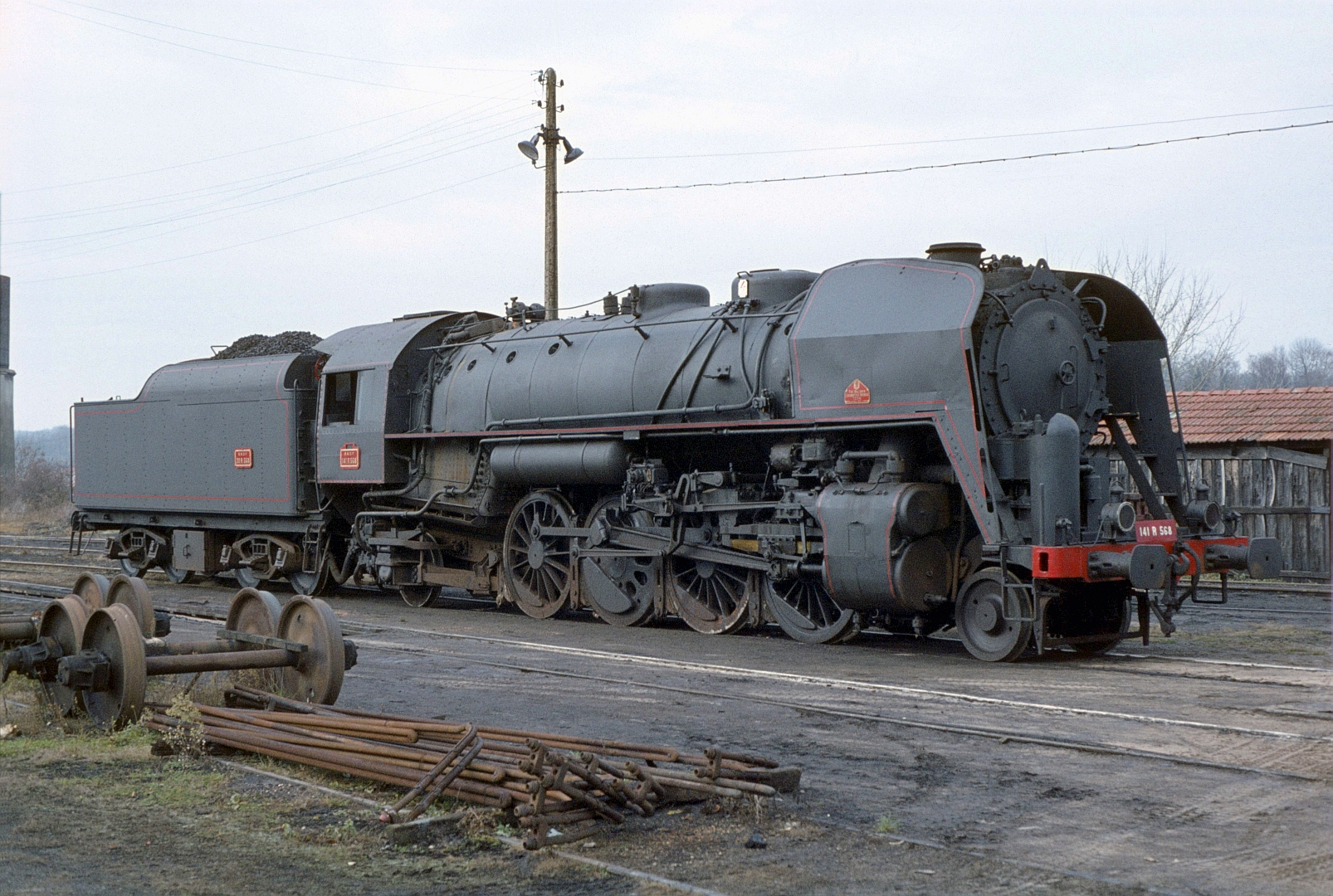
SNCF 141R Class no. 568

The most numerous steam locomotive class France had, was the American and Canadian-built 141.R class. Of the 1,340 locomotives ordered, however, only 1,323 entered service since sixteen engines were lost at sea during a storm off the coast of Newfoundland while being shipped to France, while one more was lost in Marseille harbour. They were praised for being easy to maintain and proved to be very reliable, which may account for the fact that they remained in service until the very end of the steam era in 1975. Twelve of these locomotives have been preserved.

==== Tank locomotives ====
The Chemins de fer d'Alsace et de Lorraine had a class of forty 2-8-2T locomotives, the T 14 class, later numbered SNCF 1-141.TA.501 to 1-141.TA.540. They were identical to Germany's Prussian T 14 class locomotive and were built between 1914 and 1918. (Also see Germany)

The Chemins de fer de l'Est had two Mikado classes. The first was numbered from 4401 to 4512, later renumbered 141.401 to 141.512 and finally SNCF 1-141.TB.401 to 1-141.TB.512. The other was numbered from 141.701 to 141.742 and later SNCF 1-141.TC.701 to 1-141.TC.742.

The Chemin de Fer du Nord also had two 2-8-2T classes. The first, consisting of only two locomotives, was numbered 4.1201 and 4.1202, later renumbered 4.1701 and 4.1702 and finally SNCF 2-141.TB.1 and 2-141.TB.2. The second, with 72 locomotives, was numbered from 4.1201 to 4.1272 and later SNCF 2-141.TC.1 to 2-141.TC.72.

The Chemins de Fer de l'État also had two Mikado classes. The first, numbered from 42-001 to 42-020, later became the SNCF 141.TC class and were renumbered 3-141.TC.1 to 3-141.TC.20. The second, numbered from 42-101 to 42-140, later became the SNCF 141TD class and were renumbered 3-141.TD.1 to 3-141.TD.141. They were copies of the 141.700 series of the Chemins de fer de l'Est.

The Compagnie du chemin de fer de Paris à Orléans (PO) also had two classes. The first was numbered from 5301 to 5490 and later SNCF 4-141.TA.301 to 4-141.TA.490. The second was numbered from 5616 to 5740 and later 4-SNCF 141.TB.616 to 4-141.TB.740.

=== Germany ===
German 2-8-2 tender locomotives were built in both passenger and freight versions.

- An Express-service locomotive was the DRG Class 19 „Sachsenstolz“ (Pride of Saxony), developed by the Royal Saxon State Railways as type XX $\textstyle \mathfrak{H}$$\textstyle \mathfrak{V}$ (Roman Numeral 20; superheated steam (H); compound (V)) to provide express service in the Saxonian Bohemian Massif.
- The passenger locomotive was the DRG Class 39, initially the Class P 10 of the Prussian state railways, which was built for hauling heavy express trains in the hilly and mountainous terrain of the Mittelgebirge. When they were assimilated into the Deutsche Reichsbahn-Gesellschaft (DRG), they were designated as DRG Class 39.

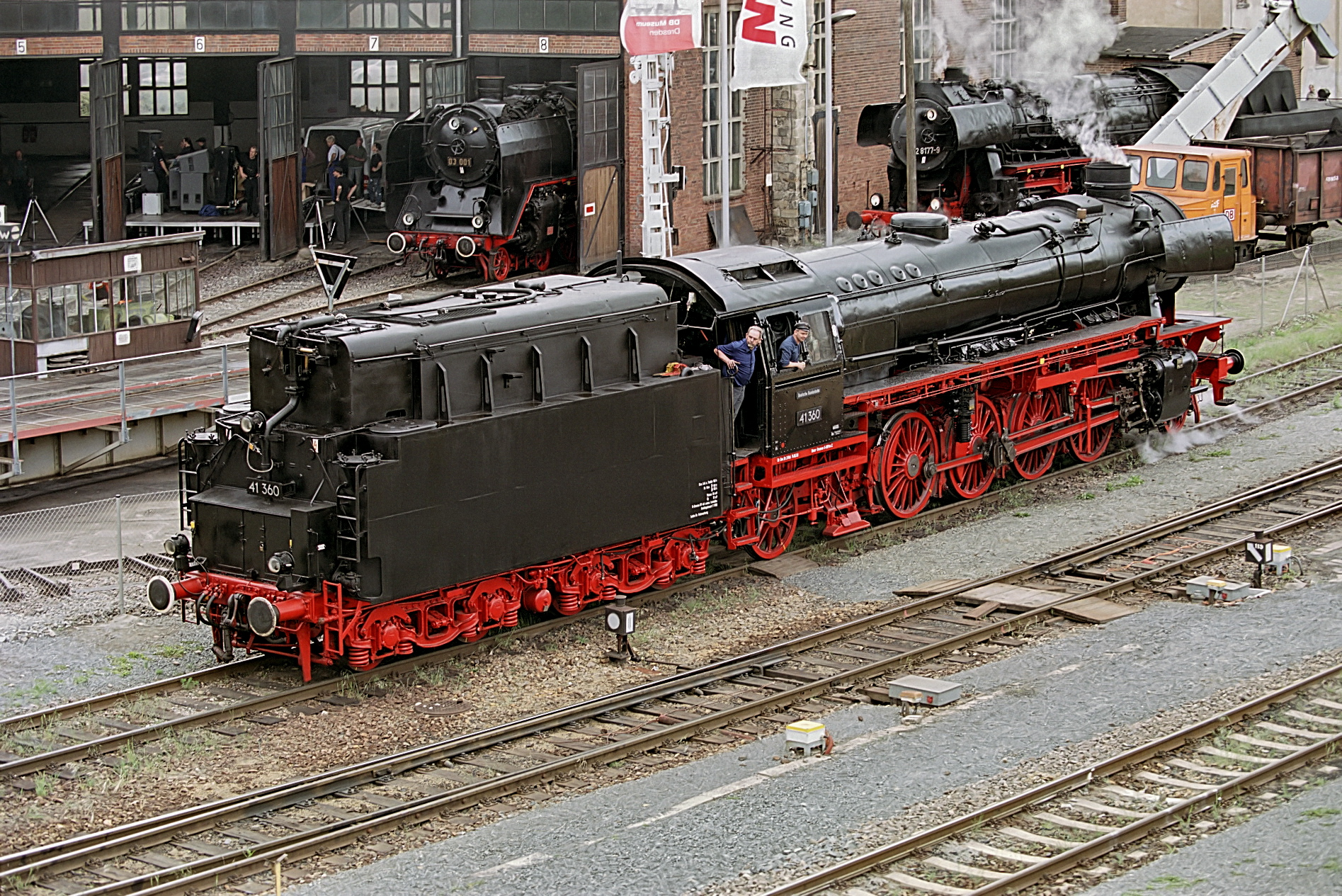
DRB Class 41 freight locomotive

- Although going out of production when the DRB consolidated their production into 2-10-0 1'E DRB Class 52 Kriegslok designs, the DRB Class 41 „Ochsenlok“ (Oxen Loco) was a successful 1'D1 2-8-2 freight locomotive also used for commuter trains. They were operated by the Deutsche Reichsbahn (DRB) and were built from 1937 to 1941, gaining notoriety as the German steam locomotive with the highest efficiency η of 10%.

Both standard gauge and narrow gauge 1D1 2-8-2 tank locomotive classes were used in Germany.

- The DRG Class 93.0-4 was a German 2-8-2T goods train tank locomotive that was used by the Prussian state railways as well as the French Chemins de fer d'Alsace et de Lorraine, designated as Class T14 by both railways. The Prussian locomotives were later incorporated by the Deutsche Reichsbahn and designated Class 93.0-4 under the DRG renumbering plan. Altogether 457 locomotives of this class were built for the Prussian state railways between 1914 and 1918. (Also see France - Tank locomotives)
- The DRG Class 86 was a standard goods train tank locomotive of the DRG. It was intended for duties on branch lines and was manufactured by almost all the locomotive building firms producing for the DRG. From 1942, a simplified wartime version was built, on which the most obvious changes were the omission of the second side windows in the cab and the solid disc carrying wheels.
- The Molli railway (Mollibahn), a narrow-gauge steam-powered railway in Mecklenburg running on 900 mm (2 ft 11 7/16 in) gauge track, operates three 2-8-2T locomotives built by Orenstein & Koppel in 1932.

=== India ===
==== Broad gauge ====
On the 5 ft 6 in (1,676 mm) gauge, the Class XD was the first 2-8-2 in India to be built in quantity. Introduced in 1927, 78 were built before the Second World War by Vulcan Foundry, North British Locomotive Company (NBL), Armstrong Whitworth and Škoda Works. Production resumed after the war, and 110 were built by NBL in 1945 and 1946, while Vulcan Foundry built the last six in 1948.

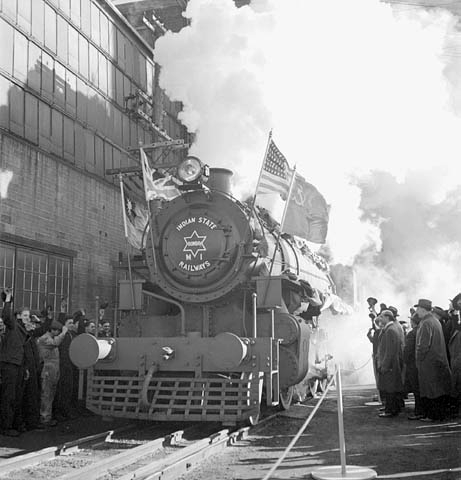
Montreal Locomotive Works-built Class X-Dominion (Class CWD)

There was also a Class XE that was built by William Beardmore & Company and Vulcan Foundry. Wartime designs included the Class AWD and Class AWE, built by American company Baldwin Locomotive Works, and the Class X-Dominion (later Class CWD) built as part of Canada's Mutual Aid program by two Canadian companies, the Canadian Locomotive Company and Montreal Locomotive Works.

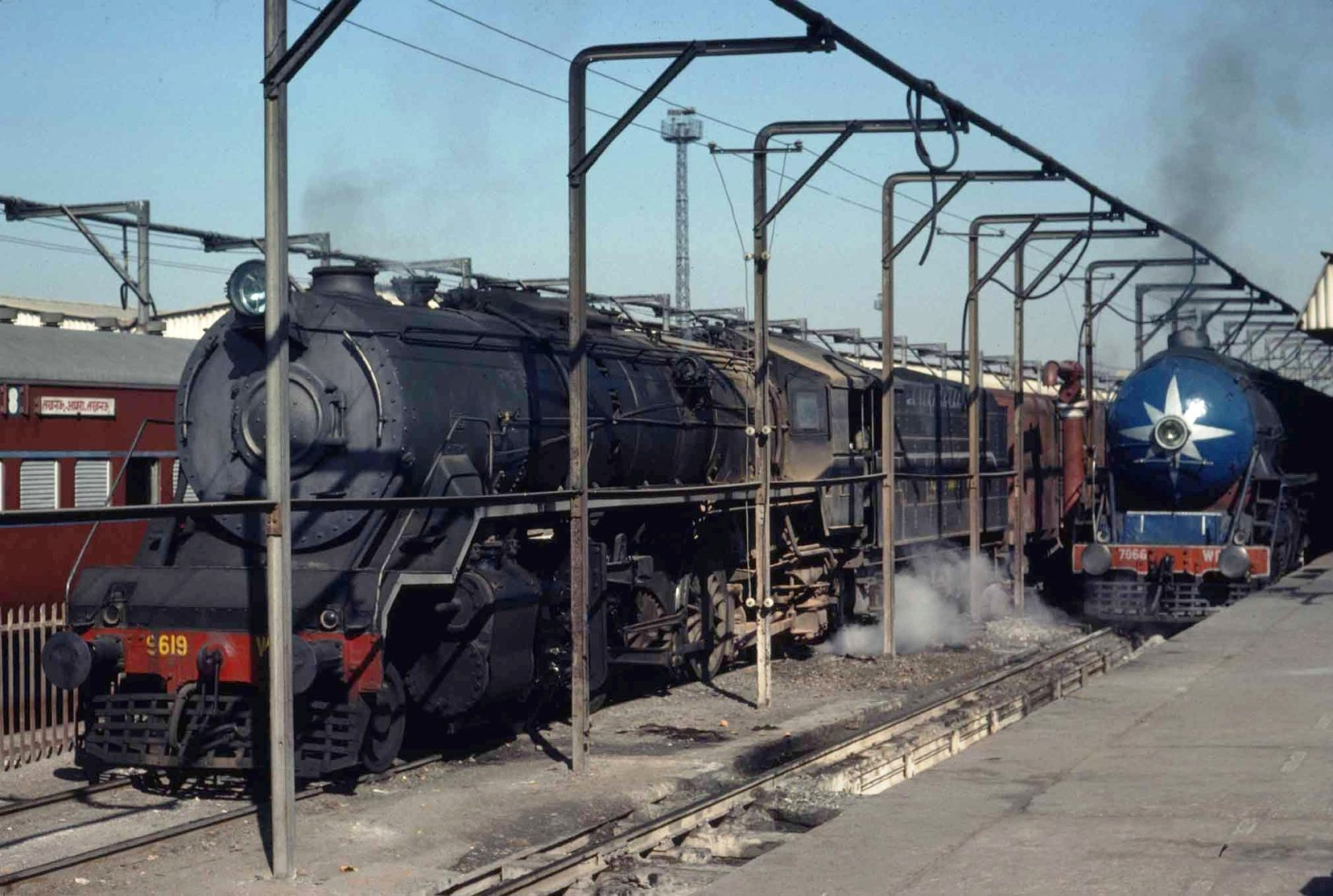
Class WG no. 9619 at Agra

After the war, a new design was produced and placed in production in 1950. The Class WG was the main post-war broad gauge freight locomotive type of the Indian Railways (IR). The first order of 200 was split evenly between NBL and Chittaranjan Locomotive Works (CLW). Apart from Indian manufacture, examples were also built in England, Scotland, Germany, Austria, the United States, Japan and Italy. By the time production ceased in 1970, 2,450 Class WG locomotives had been built.

==== Metre gauge ====
After World War I, an Indian Railway Standards (IRS) 2-8-2 class became the main heavy freight locomotive on the 1,000 mm (3 ft 3 3/8 in) metre gauge. While two versions were designed, the Class YD with a 10-ton axle load and the Class YE with a 12-ton axle load, none was built of the latter class.

During World War II, many of the war-time United States Army Transportation Corps class S118 locomotives were sent to India and 33 more were ordered after the war.

The post World War II Mikado design was the Class YG, of which 1,074 were built between 1949 and 1972, with nearly half of them being manufactured in India.

==== Narrow gauges ====
Two narrow track gauges were in use in India. The 2 ft 6 in (762 mm) gauge was the more widely used while the 2 ft (610 mm) gauge was used by the Darjeeling Himalayan Railway and the Scindia State Railway. Mikado type locomotives were used by the following:

- The Bengal Nagpur Railway used a saturated steam B class, a superheated BS class, and a BC class comprising B class locomotives that had been converted from saturated to superheated.
- The Barsi Light Railway used an F class of thirteen locomotives, ten built by Nasmyth, Wilson & Company between 1926 and 1929, and three built by Hunslet Engine Company in 1949.
- The Great Indian Peninsula Railway used a B/1 class of seven locomotives, four built by NBL in 1917, one more by NBL in 1922, and two by Nasmyth, Wilson & Company in 1926.
- The Scindia State Railway used sixteen locomotives of five classes, the Classes NH/1 through NH/5, built between 1914 and 1959.

The standard narrow gauge 2-8-2 locomotive was the ZE class, with 65 engines built by five companies between 1928 and 1954. Nasmyth, Wilson built ten in 1928, Hanomag built sixteen in 1931, Corpet-Louvet built twelve in 1950, KraussMaffei built fifteen in 1952 and another ten in 1954, and Kawasaki Heavy Industries built ten in 1954. In 1957 and 1958, six ZD class locomotives were also built by Nippon Sharyo in Japan.

=== Indonesia ===
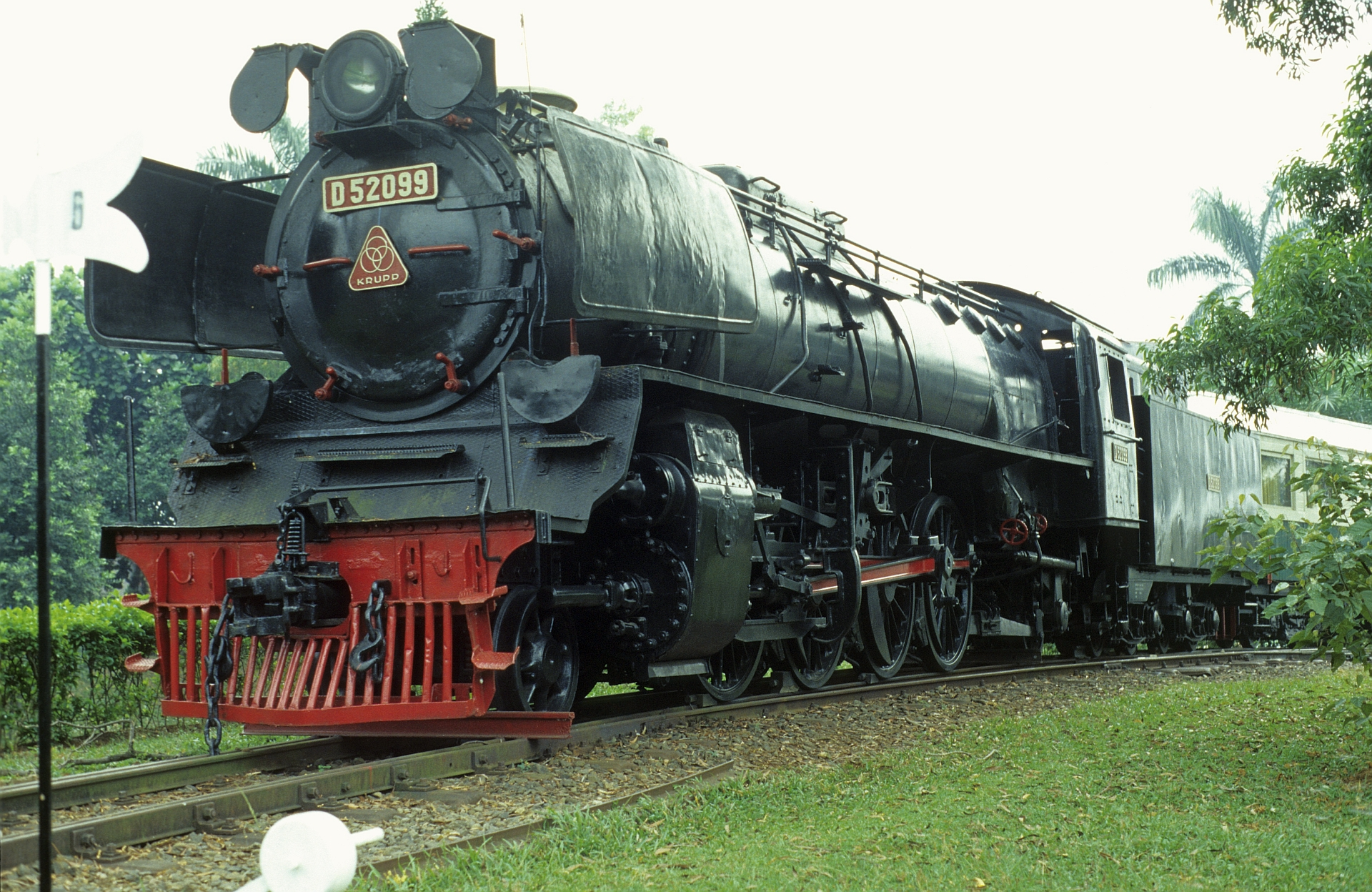
D52099 (renumbered from D52080) preserved in Taman Mini Indonesia Indah (now stored in Purwosari Station, awaiting restoration)

Before 1945, the Dutch East Indies Railway Administration, Staatspoorwegen (SS), received two types of locomotives with a 2-8-2 wheel arrangement. First, they received 10 units of 1,050 mm gauge of SS Class 1500 tender engine of 1920 from Hartmann that was previously intended for the Hejaz Railway, but later diverted to Java prior to the First World War and the drive wheels were adjusted to 1,067 mm gauge. After delivered, they present a difficulty. Their axle weigh 13 tons which way much heavier than weight permitted on bridges and mountainous lines (11 tons). Hence for safety reason, the SS 1500s were only allowed to haul light freight trains on flat lines. Second, they received 24 units of 2-8-2T from Hanomag and Werkspoor later classified as SS Class 1400 in 1921-22 which were the tank version of the 2-8-0 SS Class 900 (DKA D50). The SS Class 1400 initially was intended to be heavyweight shunter, but due to Great Depression, the SS had to preserve some of their large locomotives. So, the SS 1400s were used to haul express trains on the Bogor–Sukabumi line.

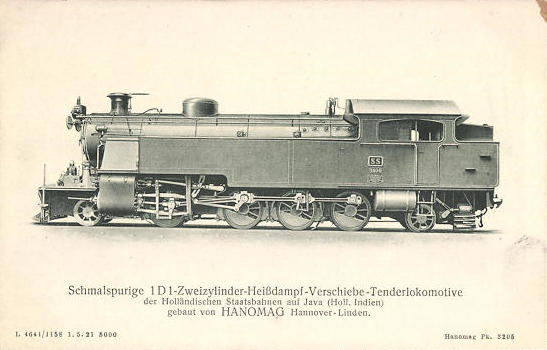
The SS Class 1400 (DKA D14) from Hanomag

This decision was made by the top brass of SS that the SS 1400s were also tough, have power output to 1171 hp. In addition, SS Class 1400 also has compact characteristic, so it was suitable to work on mountainous line. After Japanese occupation and Indonesian Independence both locomotives renumbered to D51 (SS 1500) and D14 (SS 1400) based on Japanese numberings. During the 1970s report, one of D51 (D5101) was sighted at Klakah depot at Lumajang, East Java while most of her sisters were found normally worked on Surabaya–Kroya southern line. Out of 10 units, only D51 06 preserved at Ambarawa Railway Museum. In 1970, the population of D14 locomotives continued to dwindle as they were replaced by the presence of diesel locomotives, and from 24 units only D14 10 of Hanomag is preserved. Previously, D14 10 was a static display at Taman Mini Indonesia Indah before it was brought to Pengok Workshop to conserved it and converted from oil to wood burner. Finally successfully restored in November 2019 and used today to haul excursion train in Surakarta, Central Java beside Rob's C12 18 named Sepur Kluthuk Jaladara.

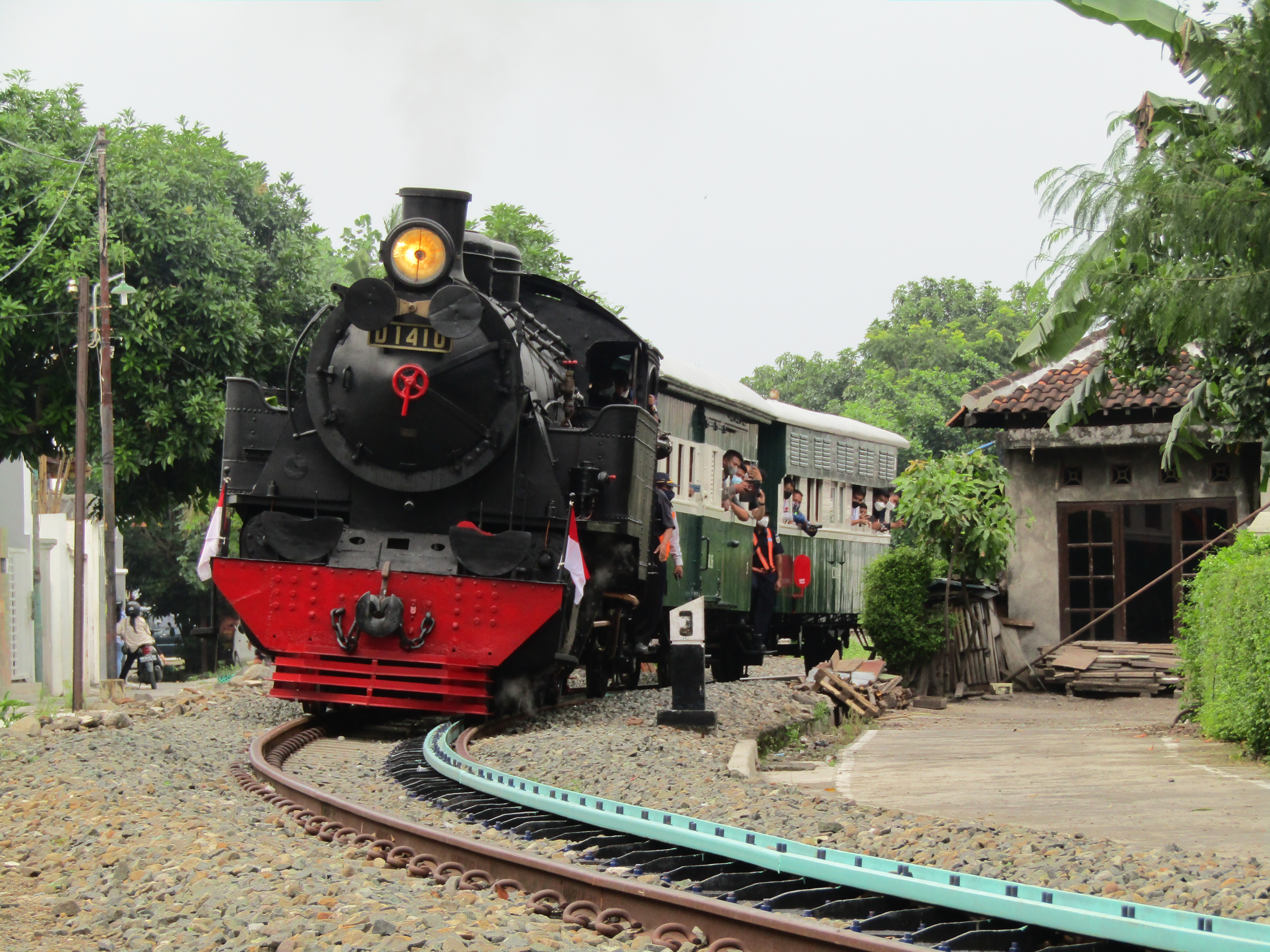
D1410 with Jaladara (2021)

After Indonesian Independence in 1945, the government of Indonesia nationalized all of the Dutch-owned railway companies, including the SS whose name was later changed to Djawatan Kereta Api (DKA) or the Department Railway of the Republic of Indonesia. Shortly after, by 1951-1952 the DKA bought 100 brand new of Mikado steam locomotives from Krupp, Germany. These locomotives, designated the D52 type, were the most modern steam locomotive in Indonesia at that time, with a large physical appearance and equipped with electric lighting. It was similar to the Class 41 locomotive of the Deutsche Reichsbahn.

In Java, the D52 locomotives were placed in passenger service, but was occasionally also used as freight locomotives. Some people even idolized the D52 because of its loyalty in taking passengers anywhere, as happened on the Rapih Dhoho Train from Madiun to Kertosono. The D52 was a mainstay for this train until the end of steam operation in Indonesia.

In contrast to the Java-based units, Sumatra-based D52 locomotives were used for hauling freight trains, mainly coal trains from the Tanjung Enim coal mine, now owned by the PT Bukit Asam mining company, to the coal dumping sites at Kertapati and Tarahan.

The D52 locomotives were initially coal-fired but, from mid-1956, 28 locomotives, numbers D52002 to D52029, were converted to oil burners. The work was done in stages over five years by the locomotive repair shop at Madiun.

One locomotive from this class was written off from service near Linggapura station after a boiler explosion that killed its driver, as a result of steam pipe failure. The only one of the original 100 locomotives that survived into the 21st century is D52 number D52099, which is on display at the Transport Museum in Taman Mini Indonesia Indah. Later on, the D52099 was moved to Purwosari station along with D14 10 which was successfully restored to action, but the D52099 still remained at the station and awaiting for another restoration.

=== Italy ===
Italian railways relied primarily on 2-6-2s for fast passenger services, while heavy passenger service was assigned to 2-8-0s of the classes 744 and 745. Although Mikado types had little opportunity for development in Italy, Ferrovie dello Stato Italiane (FS) commissioned the 2-8-2 class 746 for heavy passenger service on the Adriatic route. To serve local branches and mountain lines where tank locomotives were more suitable, FS derived the new class 940 from the 2-8-0 class 740, with the same dimensions but adding a rear Bissel truck to support the coal bunker behind the cab to make it a 2-8-2.

=== Japan ===
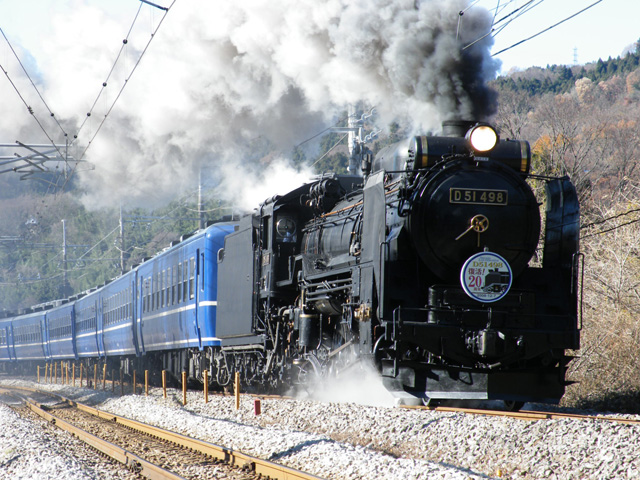
D51 498

The Japanese Government Railways (JGR) built the Class D50, Class D51, and Class D52 Mikado tender locomotives for use on the 3 ft 6 in (1,067 mm) gauge lines on the Japanese mainland and in its former colonies. (Also see Soviet Union.) Among those, the D51 was the most popular with a total of 1,115 units produced, the most of any single class of locomotive in Japan. A few of the D51s remain in operation for excursion services, with many preserved nationwide.

=== New Zealand ===
Only one 2-8-2 locomotive ever operated on New Zealand's national rail network, and it was not even ordered by the New Zealand Railways Department, who ran almost the entire network. The locomotive was ordered in 1901 from Baldwin Locomotive Works by the Wellington & Manawatu Railway Company (WMR) for use on their main line's steep section between Wellington and Paekakariki. It entered service on 10 June 1902 as the WMR's no. 17. At the time, it was the most powerful locomotive in New Zealand and successfully performed its intended tasks.

When the WMR was incorporated into the national network in 1908, the Railways Department reclassified no. 17 as the solitary member of the B^{C} class, no. B^{C} 463, and the locomotive continued to operate on the Wellington-Paekakariki line until it was withdrawn on 31 March 1927.

=== Philippines ===
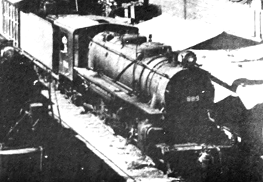
Manila Railroad no. 889 in the 1940s, one of the 45 USATC Class S118s of the agency.

According to Iowa State University professor Jonathan Smith, the Mikado was the most popular wheel arrangement of freight-purpose tender locomotives on the Manila Railroad. 67 units of the wheel class were delivered between 1927 and 1951, distributed into 4 classes.

The first 2-8-2 steam locomotive was the Baldwin-built Manila Railroad 250 class introduced in 1928. It was the freight version of the 4-6-2 Pacific-type 140 class built for passenger rail services in Luzon. More classes were ordered after the war. The United States Army Transportation Corps class S118, locally referred to as the Manila Railroad 800 class USA in which 45 units were ordered in 1944. These were numbered 851 to 895, with three named locomotives have been named: No. 865 Huckleberry Finn, No. 866 Tom Sawyer and No. 867 Hanibella. Two more locomotives were ordered in 1948 from the War Assets Administration and were numbered the 630 class. These were locally assembled at the MRR workshop in Caloocan. Lastly, 10 JNR Class D51 locomotives were ordered from Nippon Sharyo in 1951 and were numbered the 300 class according to the Brotherhood of Locomotive Engineers and Trainmen.

All of these locomotives were decommissioned in 1956 and were scrapped afterwards.

=== Poland ===
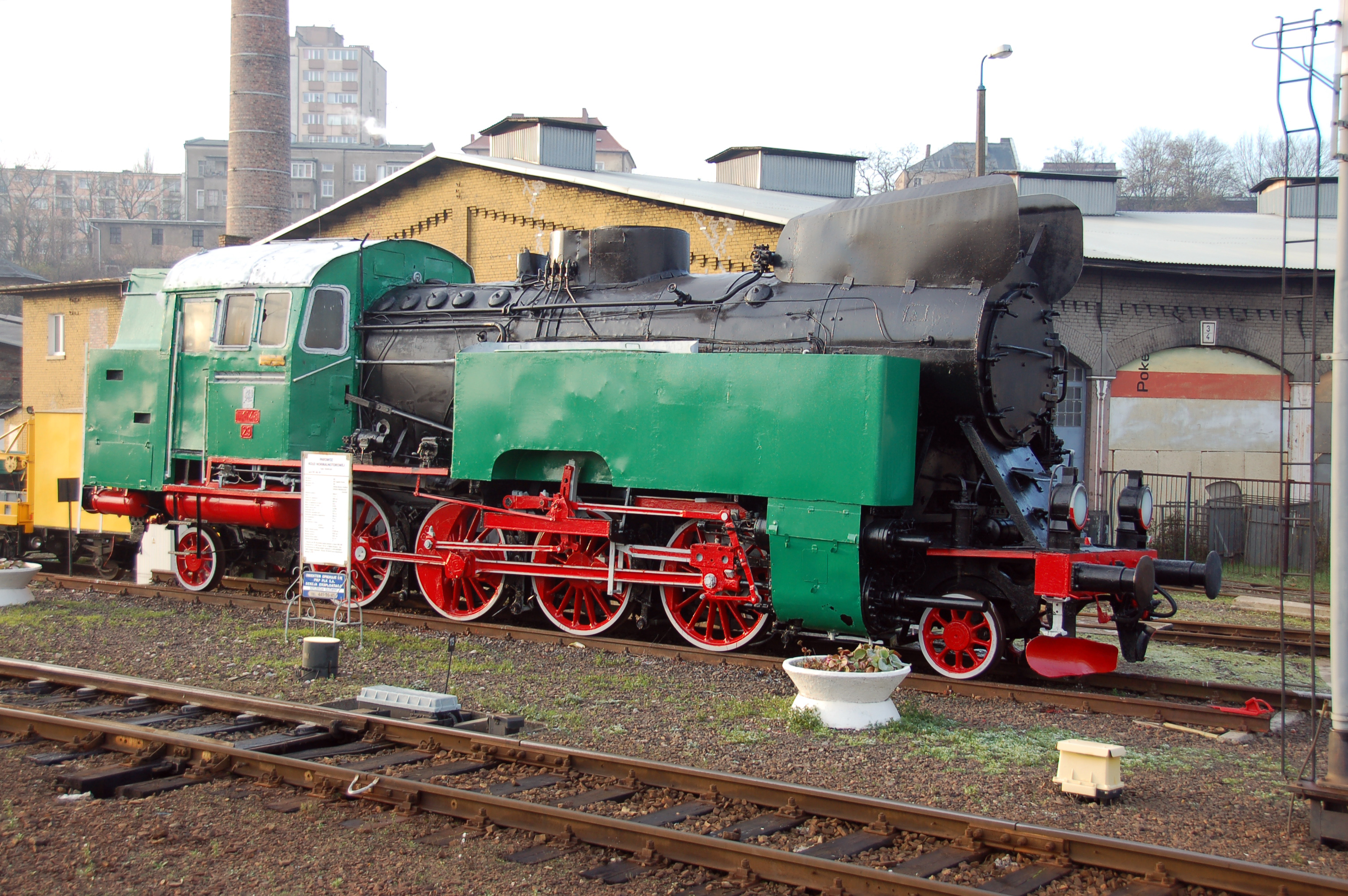
Preserved TKt48 on display at Szczecin

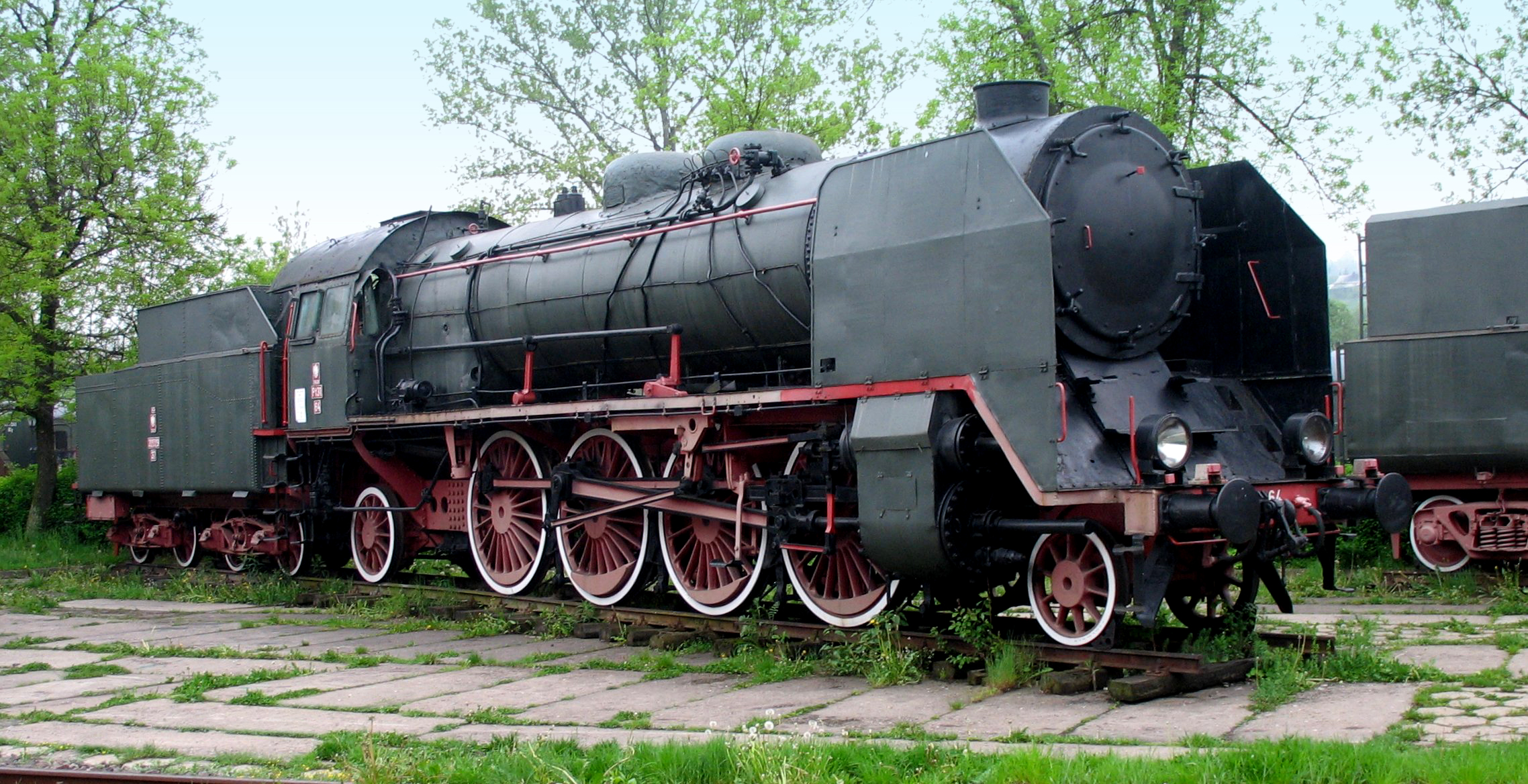
Preserved Pt31

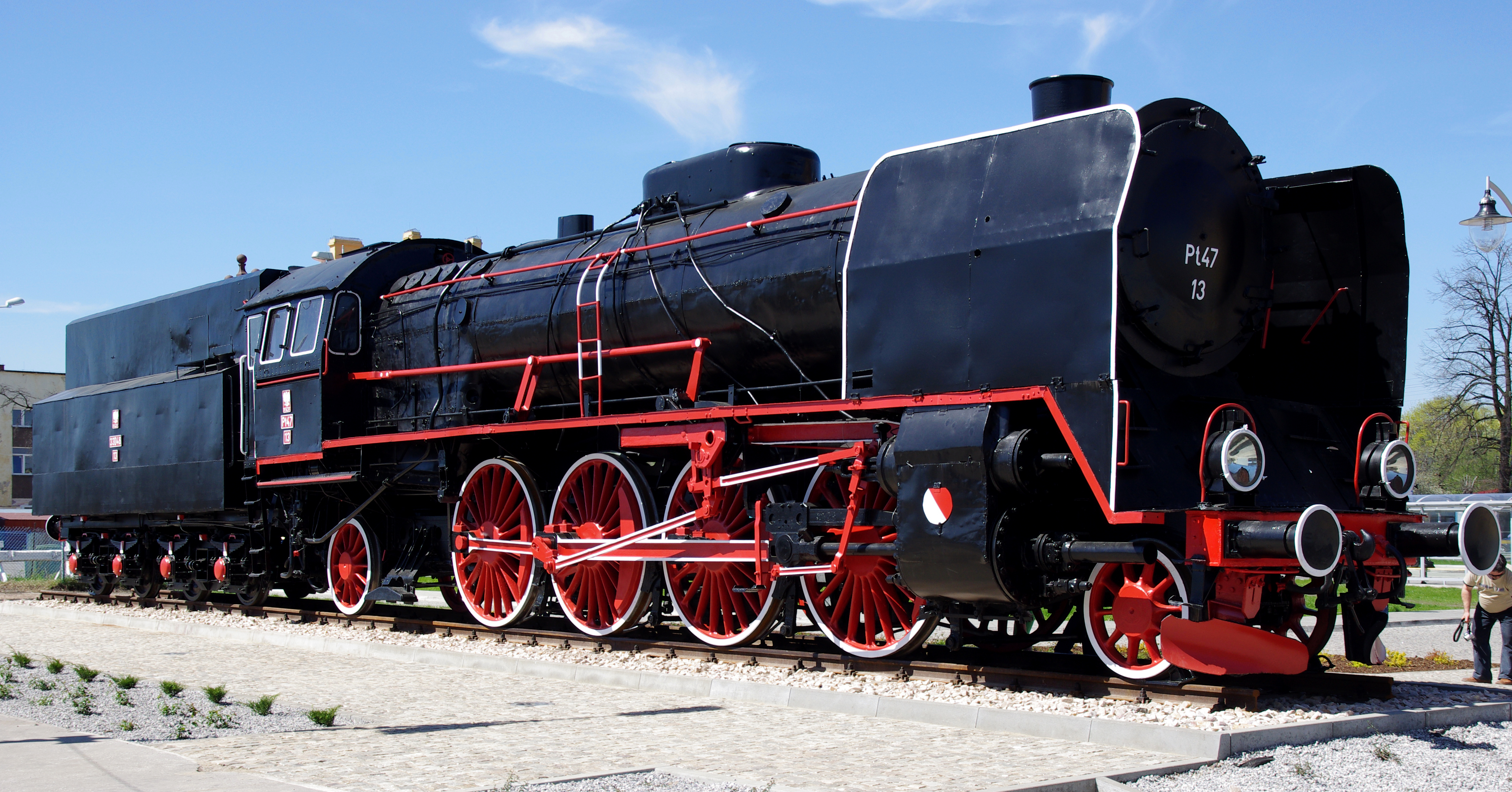
Preserved Pt47-13 at Skarżysko-Kamienna

Between 1932 and 1939, Polish industry supplied PKP with 98 Mikados of class Pt31 of own design (further 12 were built under German occupation). After World War II additional 180 of improved class Pt47 were built until 1951. Both classes were used to run heavy (600 ton) long-distance passenger trains on main lines. They were the most powerful passenger locomotives in Poland. Their wheel diameter was 1.85 m, power output 2000 hp and speed 110 km/h.

191 TKt48 2-8-2 tank locomotives were delivered to PKP between 1950 and 1957, with additional two built for the industry and six exported to Albania. They were used on suburban passenger trains and on goods trains in lower mountain areas.

=== South Africa ===
Only six Mikado locomotive classes saw service in South Africa, five on Cape gauge and one on narrow gauge. The type was rare, with only two of these classes built in quantity.

==== Cape gauge ====
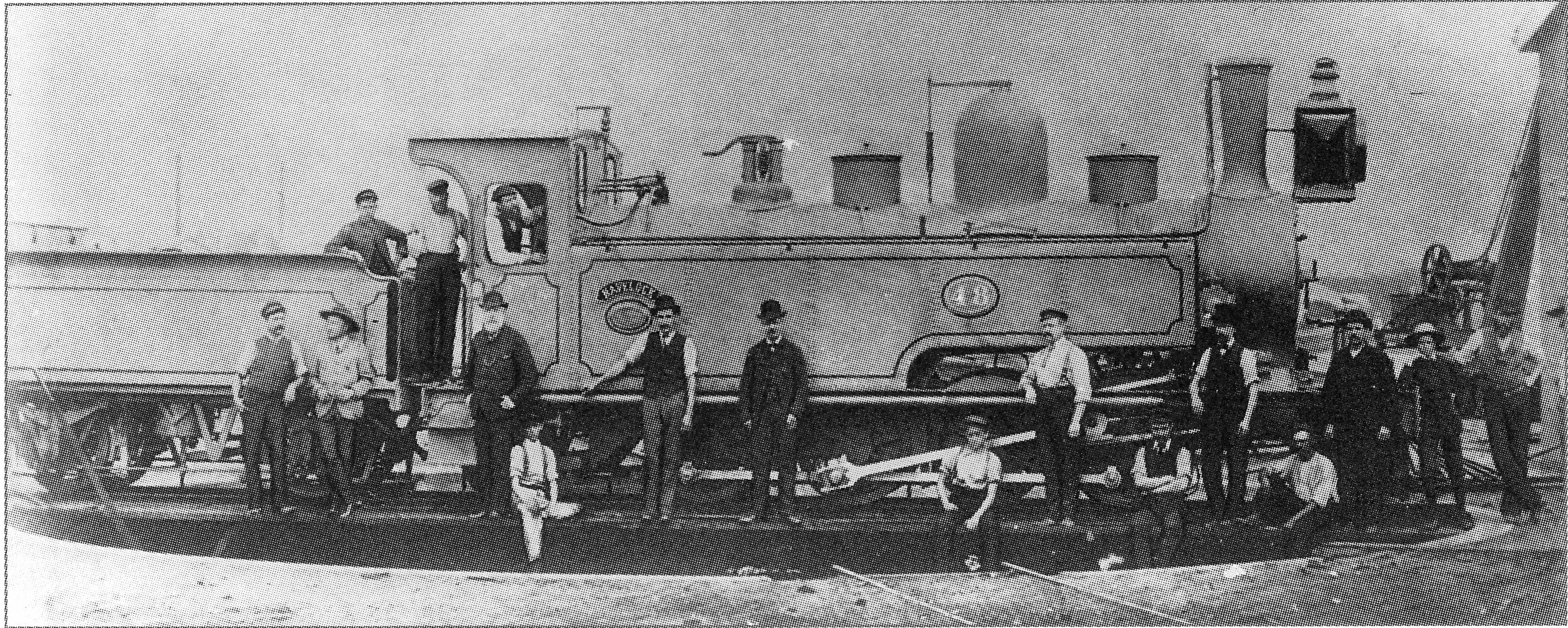
NGR Havelock, c. 1888

During 1887, designs for a 2-8-2 Mikado type tank-and-tender locomotive were prepared by the Natal Government Railways. The single locomotive was built in the Durban workshops and entered service in 1888, named Havelock, but was soon rebuilt to a 4-6-2 Pacific configuration. The engine Havelock was the first locomotive to be designed and built in South Africa and also the first to have eight-coupled wheels.

In 1903, the Cape Government Railways (CGR) placed two Cape Class 9 2-8-2 locomotives in service, designed by H.M. Beatty, Locomotive Superintendent of the CGR from 1896 to 1910, and built by Kitson & Company. They had bar frames, Stephenson's link motion valve gear and used saturated steam. In comparison with the Cape Class 8 2-8-0 locomotive of 1901, however, it was found that their maintenance costs were much higher without any advantage in terms of efficiency. As a result, no more of the type were ordered. In 1912, when these locomotives were assimilated into the South African Railways (SAR), they were classified as Class Experimental 4.

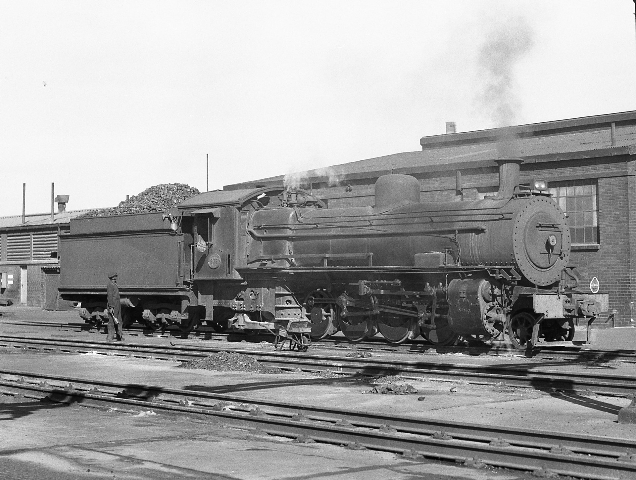
SAR Class 11 no. 933

In 1904, the Central South African Railways (CSAR) placed 36 Class 11 Mikados in service. Built by the North British Locomotive Company (NBL), it was designed by P.A. Hyde, Chief Locomotive Superintendent of the CSAR from 1902 to 1904, for goods train service on the Witwatersrand. It was superheated, with a Belpaire firebox, Walschaerts valve gear and plate frame. The Class 11 designation was retained when the CSAR was amalgamated into the SAR in 1912.

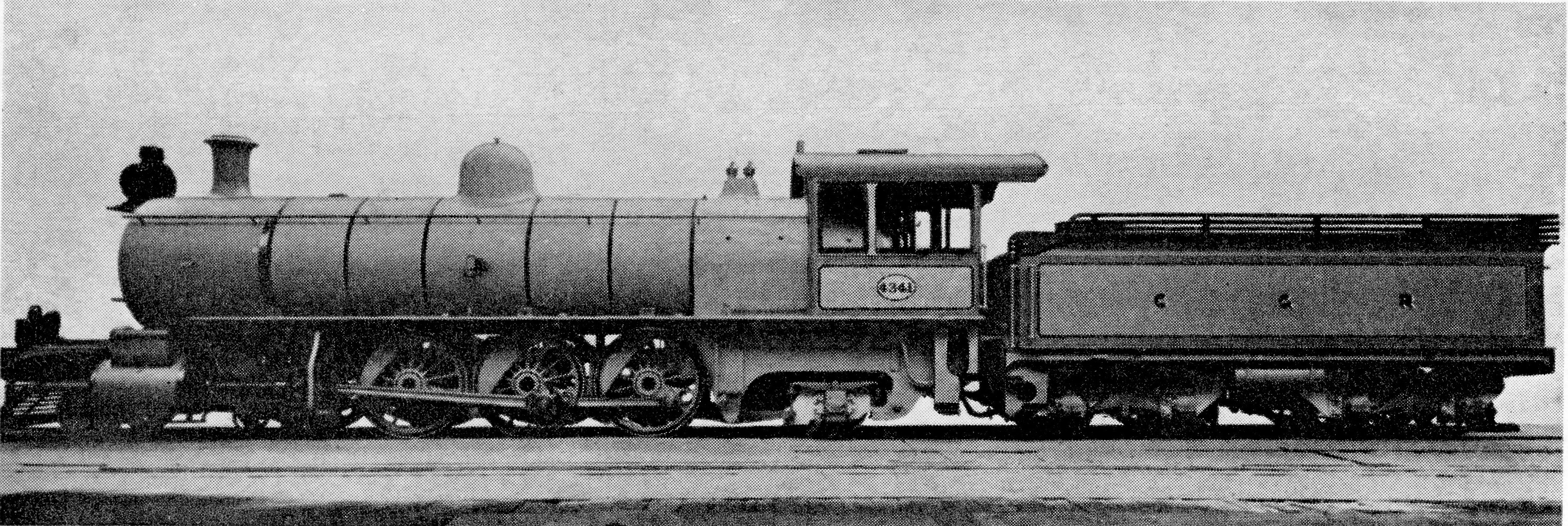
SAR Class Experimental 5

In 1906, the CGR placed a single experimental 2-8-2 in service, designed by H.M. Beatty and built by Kitson. It was a larger version of the Cape Class 9 in all respects, also with a bar frame, Stephenson's link motion valve gear and using saturated steam. The locomotive was not classified and was simply referred to as "the Mikado". On the CGR it was exceeded in size only by the Kitson-Meyer 0-6-0+0-6-0 of 1904. At the time, it was considered as a big advance in motive power, but the design was never repeated and the Cape Mikado remained unique. In 1912, it was classified as Class Experimental 5 on the SAR.

In 1917, the South African Railways placed at least four, possibly six, Mikado type steam locomotives in service. They had been built for the Chemins de Fer du Bas Congo á Katanga in the Belgian Congo and were obtained on temporary lease, to alleviate the critical shortage of locomotives as a result of the First World War's disruption of locomotive production in Europe and the United Kingdom. The Katanga Mikados, as the locomotives were known on the SAR, were all forwarded to the Belgian Congo after the war.

==== Narrow gauge ====
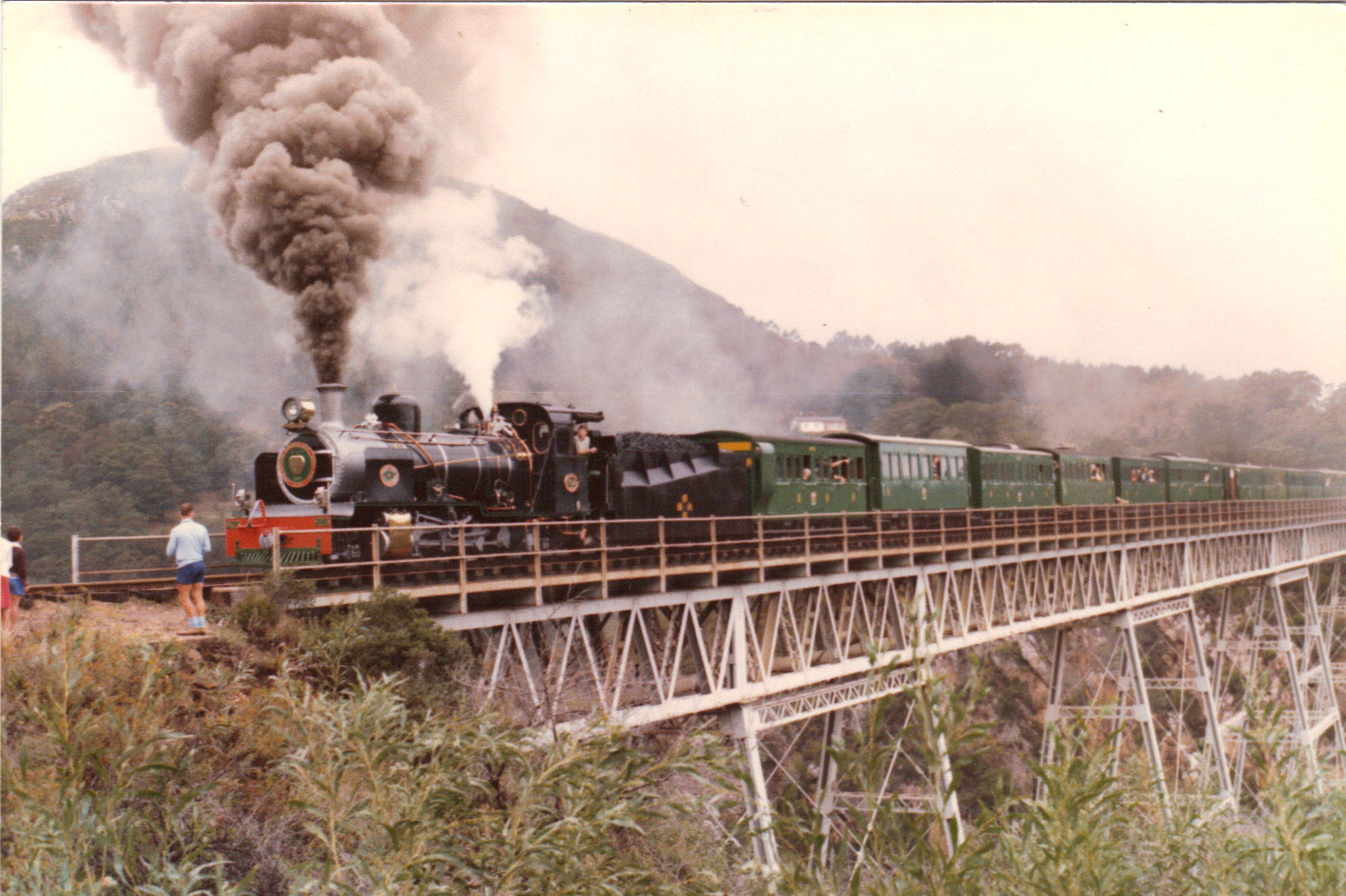
SAR Class NG15 crossing the Van Stadens river bridge

Between 1931 and 1958, 21 2 ft (610 mm) narrow gauge Class NG15 Mikados, developed from the Class Hd and Class NG5 of South West Africa (SWA), were acquired for the Otavi Railway in SWA. Designed by the SAR, it was built by Henschel & Son and Société Franco-Belge. A major improvement on the earlier locomotives was the use of a Krauss-Helmholtz bogie, with the leading pair of driving wheels linked to the leading pony truck. The leading driving wheels had a limited amount of side play while the axle still remained parallel to the other three driving axles at all times, thus allowing the locomotive to negotiate sharper curves than its two predecessors. When the SWA narrow gauge line was regauged to Cape gauge in 1960, all these locomotives were transferred to the Eastern Cape for further service on the Langkloof narrow gauge line from Port Elizabeth to Avontuur. Here they were nicknamed the Kalahari. Victorias Milling Co. 2H is a Henschel built 0-8-0T dated 1927.

=== South West Africa (Namibia) ===
Two very similar Mikado classes saw service on the 600 mm (1 ft 11 5/8 in) narrow gauge Otavi Railway in South West Africa (SWA).

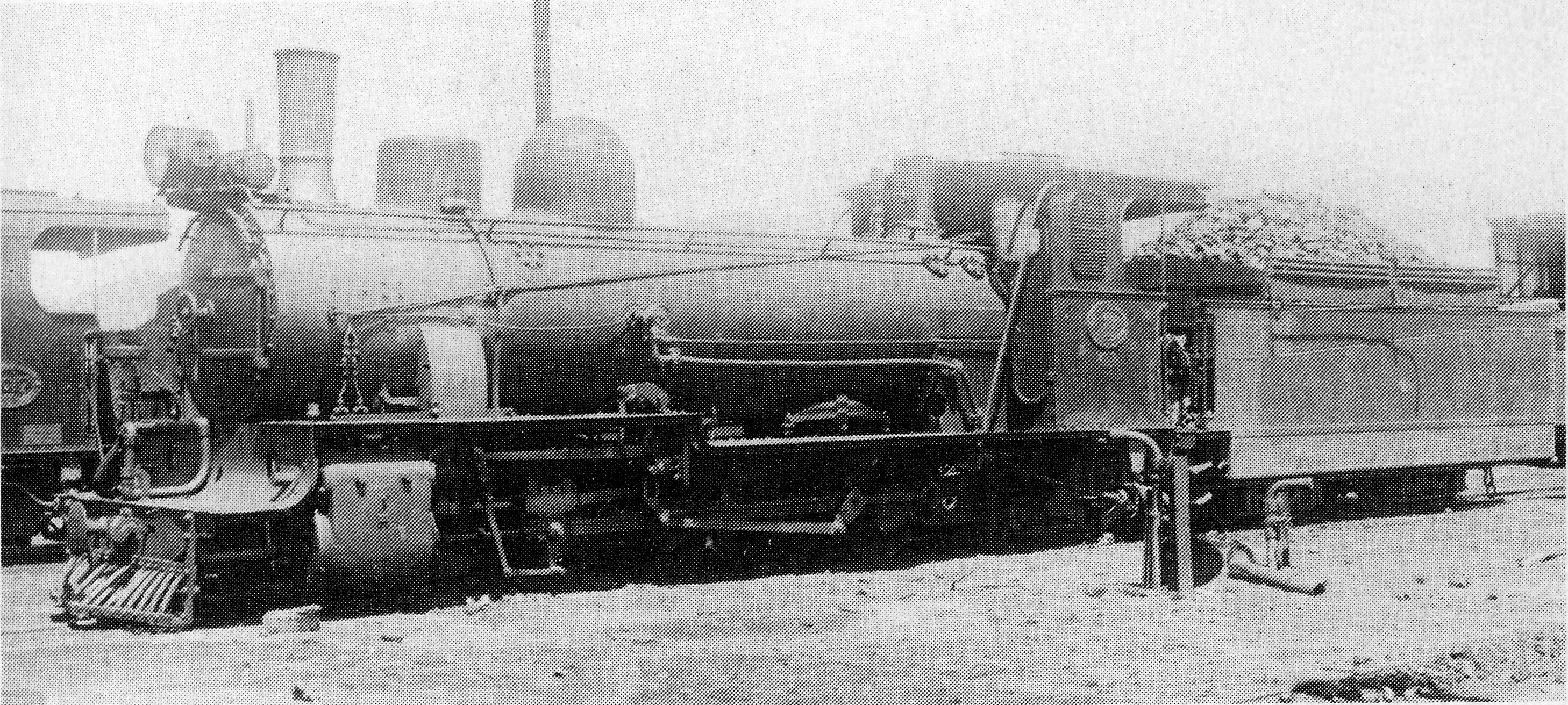
SAR Class NG5, c. 1960

In 1912, the German administration in Deutsch-Südwest-Afrika acquired three locomotives for use on the line from Swakopmund to Karibib. They were built by Henschel & Son and were designated Class Hd. The locomotives were superheated, with Heusinger valve gear, piston valves and outside plate frames. Since they did not have separate bogie trucks, the leading and trailing carrying wheels were arranged as radial axles to allow for sideways motion of the wheels with respect to the locomotive frame. After the First World War, they were taken onto the roster of the South African Railways (SAR) and later reclassified as Class NG5 along with the similar locomotives of 1922.

In 1922, the SAR placed six Class NG5 locomotives in service on the Otavi branch in SWA, also built by Henschel. They were built to the same design as the Class Hd, but had a different coupled wheel suspension arrangement, different boilers and slide valves. In service, they were operated in a common pool with the Class Hd locomotives until they were all withdrawn from service when the SWA system was regauged to Cape gauge in 1960.

=== Soviet Union ===
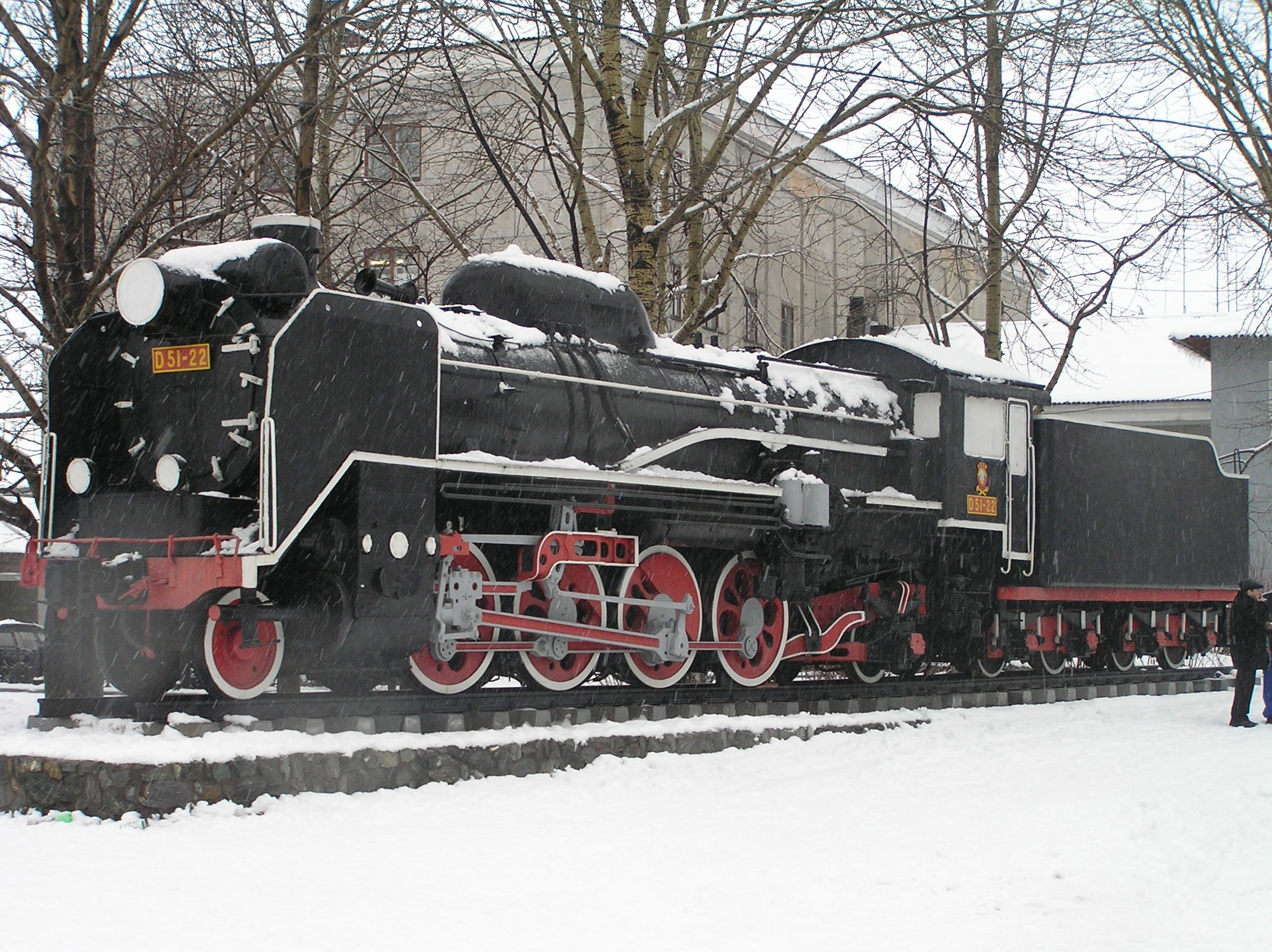
JNR Class D51-22 on Sakhalin Island

At the end of the Second World War, several 3 ft 6 in (1,067 mm) gauge Japanese Class D51 2-8-2 locomotives were left behind on Russia's Sakhalin island, formerly Karafuto, by retreating Japanese forces. In addition, two Class D51 wrecks were abandoned to the north of the city. Until 1979, the serviceable Japanese locomotives were used on the island by the Soviet Railways.

One was then plinthed outside the Yuzhno-Sakhalinsk railway station, and another is still in running condition and is kept at the Yuzhno-Sakhalinsk railway station.

The Sakhalin Railway has a connection with the mainland via a train ferry operating between Kholmsk on the island and Vanino on the mainland. The Japanese gauge still remains in use on the island, although in 2004 conversion began to the Russian 1,520 mm (4 ft 11 27/32 in) gauge. (Also see Japan)

=== Spain ===
The 1,668 mm (5 ft 5 21/32 in) Iberian gauge network of Spain used one Mikado tank locomotive and two versions of tender locomotives.

The Spanish manufacturer MTM delivered six 2-8-2T locomotives to the Madrid-Caceres-Portugal line in 1925. A project at MTM in 1942 to build a big 2-8-2 never realised.

The first tender version was built by two American companies in 1917, fifteen by Brooks Locomotive Works and forty by Schenectady Locomotive Works. They were numbered from 4501 to 4555 and were a slightly smaller version of the USRA Light Mikado. The locomotives served well in the Norte system, where they were nicknamed Chalecos.

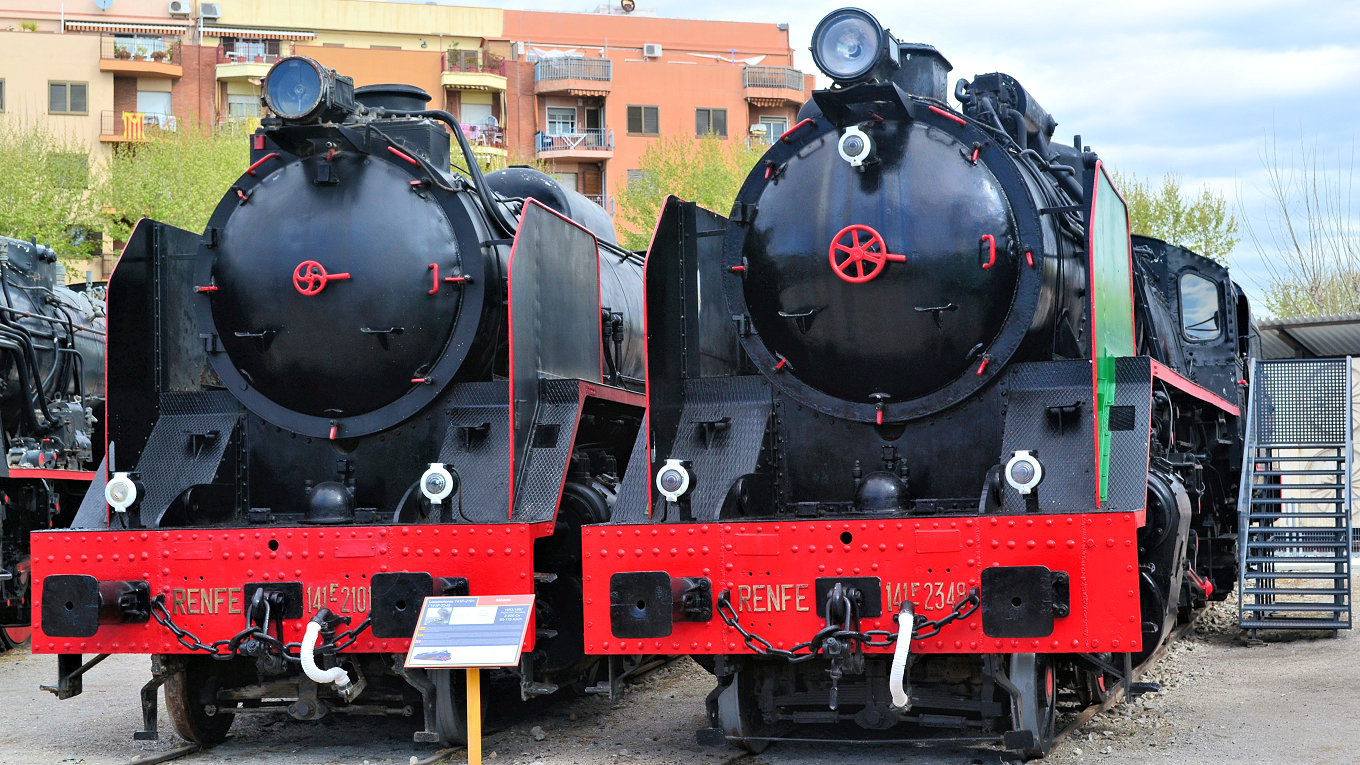
141F Nos. 141F-2101 and 141F-2348 at the Catalonia Railway Museum

In 1953, RENFE (acronym of Red Nacional de los Ferrocarriles Españoles), the nationalised railway company, acquired twenty-five locomotives of the second tender version from North British Locomotive Company (NBL) of Glasgow. Spanish builders MTM, MACOSA and Euskalduna and the American Babcock & Wilcox built 213 more between 1953 and 1960, with only minor detail differences such as double chimneys, Llubera sanders, ACFI feedwater heaters and oil-burning. Their empty weight was 94 tonnes (92.5 long tons; 103.6 short tons) and they had 1,560 millimetres (61.42 inches) diameter coupled wheels. They performed well in both freight and passenger service and lasted until the official end of steam in common service in 1975.

One Norte and eighteen RENFE locomotives are preserved, three of them in good working condition.

=== Thailand (Siam) ===
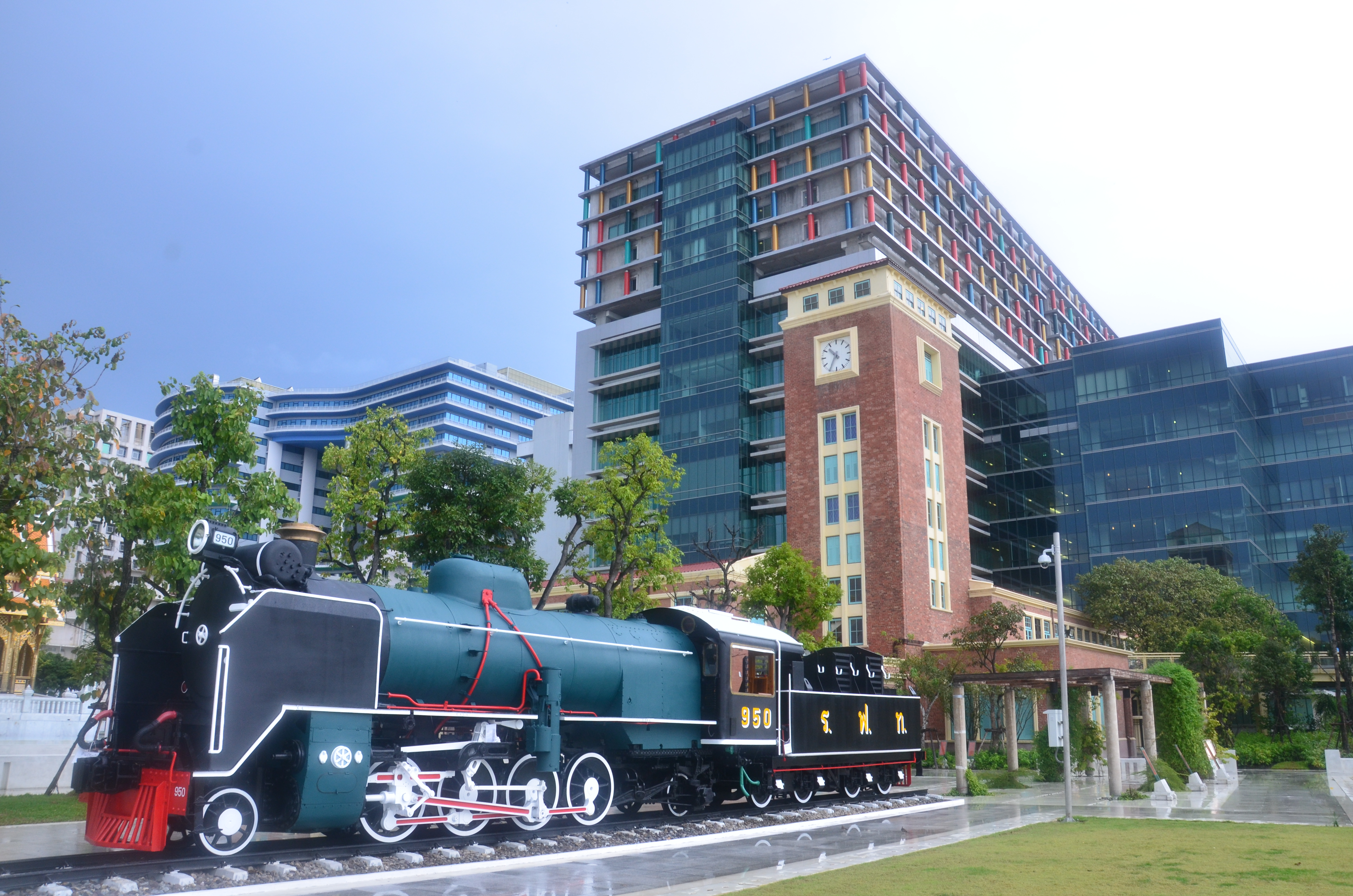
Mikado 950, imported to Thailand 1950 on exhibition before the old Bangkok-Thonburi Station.

The first Mikado locomotives of the Royal State Railways of Siam (RSR), the predecessor of the State Railway of Thailand (SRT), were acquired from 1923 as standard locomotives for express and mixed trains, to supersede the E-Class locomotives which had been commissioned between 1915 and 1921. The first Siamese Mikado class was built by Baldwin Locomotive Works in 1923, Nasmyth, Wilson & Company in 1924 and Batignolles-Châtillon, France in 1925.

However, it was not until the first batch of eight of Thailand's second class of 2-8-2 locomotives, numbers 351 to 358, was imported from Japan in 1936 that Mikado locomotives really became successful in Thailand. The RSR imported more Mikado standard locomotives to meet railways as well as military demands between 1938 and 1945.

After the Second World War, in 1946, the RSR imported fifty used United States Army Transportation Corps class S118 locomotives, the so-called MacArthur Locomotives. Another eighteen new engines of the same Class were purchased around 1948-1949 to meet the post-war demand.

The last type of Mikado steam locomotives for Thailand were seventy engines imported by SRT from Japan between 1949 and 1951, numbered 901 to 970. Of these, only Mikado no. 953 is still serviceable, and runs passenger trains on special occasions.

=== United Kingdom ===
The 2-8-2 wheel arrangement was rarely, but successfully, used on British rails. Nigel Gresley of the London & North Eastern Railway (LNER) designed two Mikado types of note:

- The Class P1 was a freight derivative of his famed Class A1 4-6-2, inspired by the Pennsylvania Railroad's twin K4s 4-6-2 and L1s 2-8-2 locomotives. Two were built, but there was never really much call for their ability and they remained under-utilised throughout their short existence.
- Gresley's other class of Mikados was his Class P2. These were express passenger locomotives, rather more inspired by European influences than American. They were built to haul heavy express trains in hilly terrain north of Edinburgh, where Gresley thought the additional adhesion possible with a 2-8-2 might serve well. Unfortunately, poor self-centering on the leading truck meant that the leading driving wheels wore against the rails on tighter curves, being hard on both track and wheels. Gresley's successor Edward Thompson converted the Class P2s into 4-6-2 Pacifics. In June 2014, a new Class P2 Mikado locomotive, 2007 The Prince of Wales, intended to work both on mainline and preserved railways, was under construction by the P2 Steam Locomotive Company.

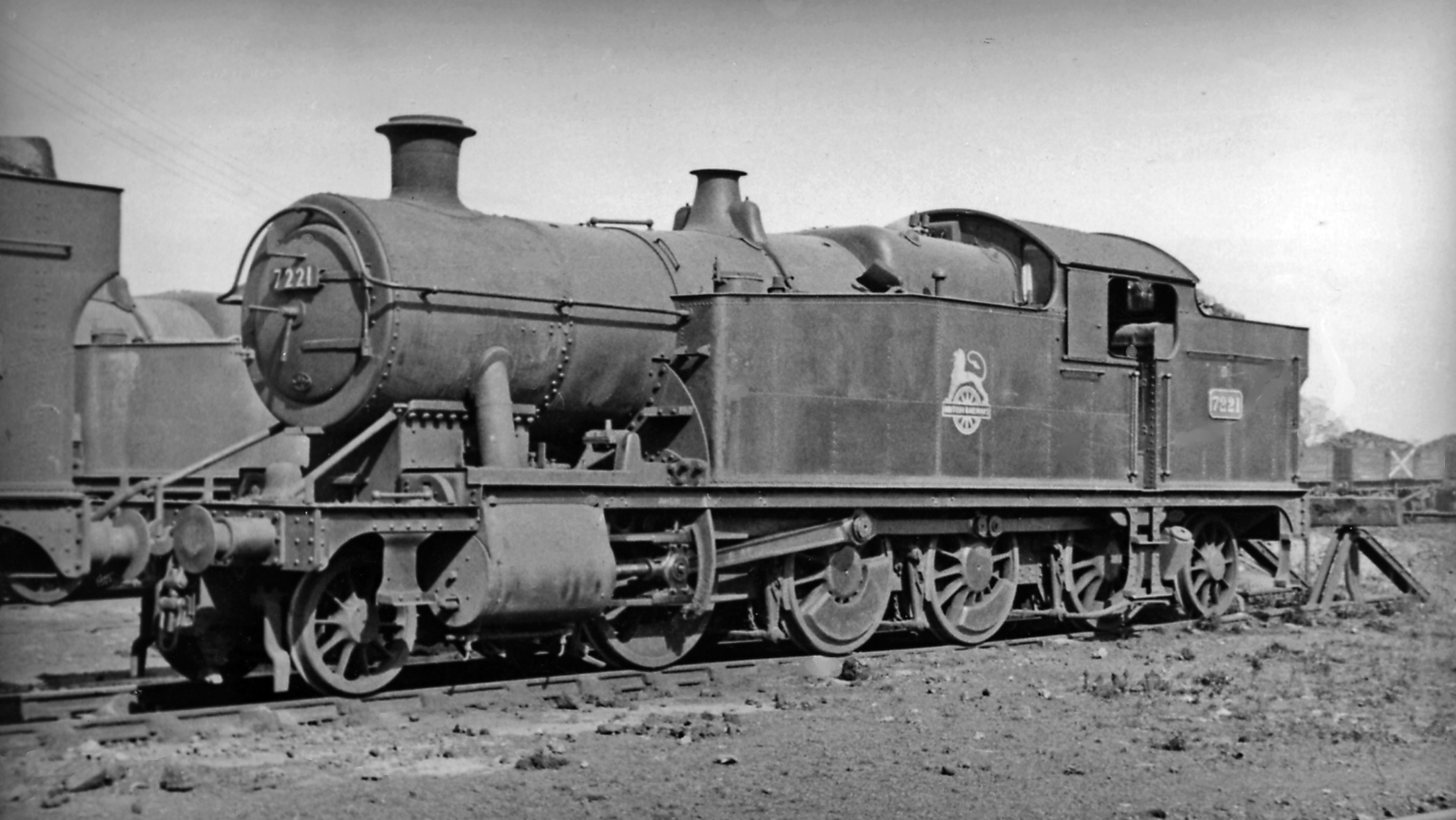
Collett 7200 Class no. 7221

The Great Western Railway (GWR) operated a class of 54 2-8-2T engines that had been rebuilt from 2-8-0T locomotives by Charles Collett, chief mechanical engineer of the GWR. As early as 1906, the chief mechanical engineer at the time, George Churchward, planned a class of Mikado tank engines to handle heavy coal trains in South Wales. The plan was abandoned, however, as it was feared they would be unable to handle the sharp curves present on Welsh mineral branches. Instead, Churchward designed the 4200 Class of 2-8-0 tank engines, of which nearly 200 were built.

In the 1930s, coal traffic declined with the result that many of these engines stood idle, since their limited operating range prevented them from being allocated to other mainline duties. Collett, as Churchward's successor, decided to rebuild some of the 4200 Class engines as 2-8-2Ts. The addition of a trailing axle increased the engine's operating range by allowing an increased coal and water storage capacity. Altogether 54 locomotives were modified in this manner. The 7200 Class tank engines, as they were known, remained in service until the end of steam in Britain in the early 1960s.

The designer of the BR Standard Class 9F locomotive as well as the rest of the BR standard classes as Chief Mechanical Engineer of British Railways, Robert Riddles, originally designed the aforementioned locomotive to be a 2-8-2 using the boiler from one of the 4-6-2 passenger locomotive standard classes. However, he later decided to use a 2-10-0 wheel arrangement with a new boiler design, as it offered more tractive effort and better weight distribution.

=== United States ===
The first 2-8-2 type ever built was Lehigh Valley No. 82 "Bee" designed by Alexander Mitchell and built by the Norris Locomotive Works in 1867.

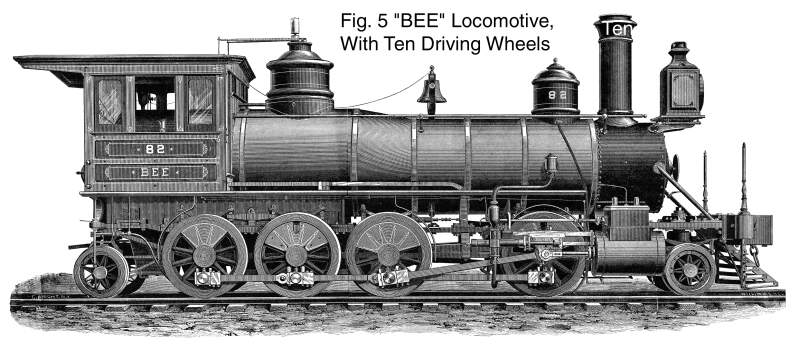
Lehigh Valley No. 82 "Bee" after being rebuilt from a 2-10-0, thus becoming the first 2-8-2 "Mikado" type in 1867/

The locomotive originally was built as a 2-10-0 "Decapod" type locomotive. The engines were troublesome around curves and were prone to instability. So the locomotives rearmost driver was removed and replaced with a pair of small wheels connected to a trailing truck slightly hanging behind the cab.

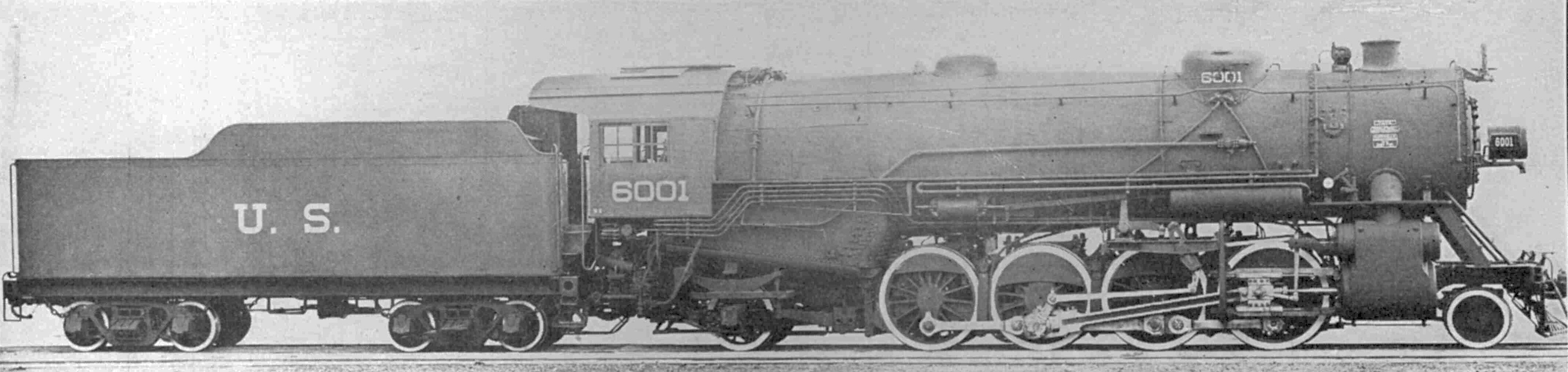
USRA Heavy Mikado

The 2-8-2 saw great success in the United States, mostly as a freight locomotive. In the 1910s it largely replaced the 2-8-0 Consolidation as the main heavy freight locomotive type. Its tractive effort was similar to that of the best 2-8-0s, but a developing requirement for higher speed freight trains drove the shift to the 2-8-2 wheel arrangement.

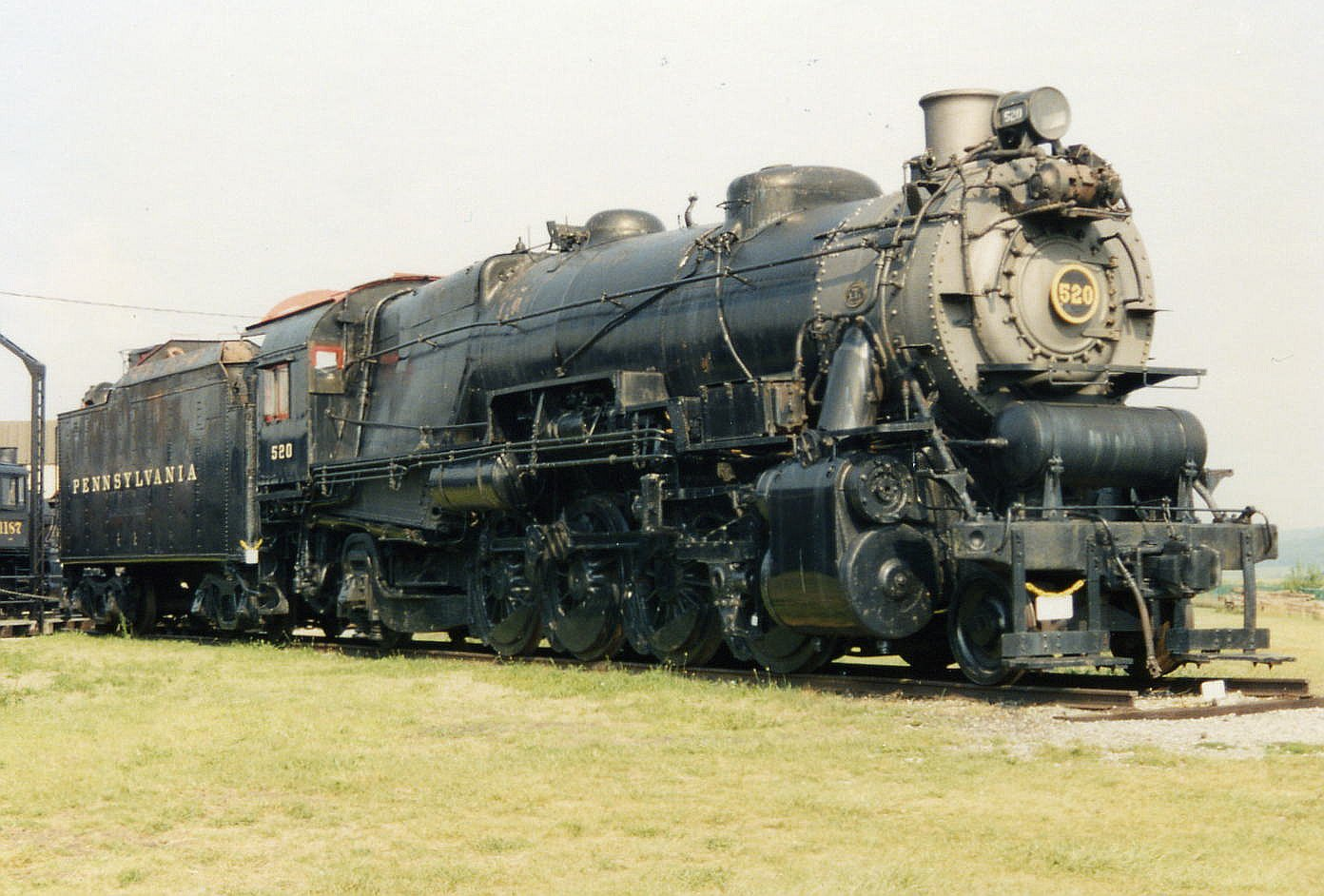
Pennsylvania Railroad L1 class no. 520 at the Pennsylvania Railroad Museum, Strasburg, Pennsylvania

The Mikado type was, in turn, ousted from the top-flight trains by larger freight locomotive wheel arrangements such as the 2-8-4, 2-10-2, 2-10-4 and articulated locomotives, but no successor type became ubiquitous and the Mike remained the most common road freight locomotive with most railroads until the end of steam. More than 14,000 were built in the United States, about 9,500 of these for North American service, constituting about one-fifth of all locomotives in service there at the time. The heaviest Mikados were the Great Northern's class O-8, with an axle load of 81,250 pounds (36,854 kilograms).

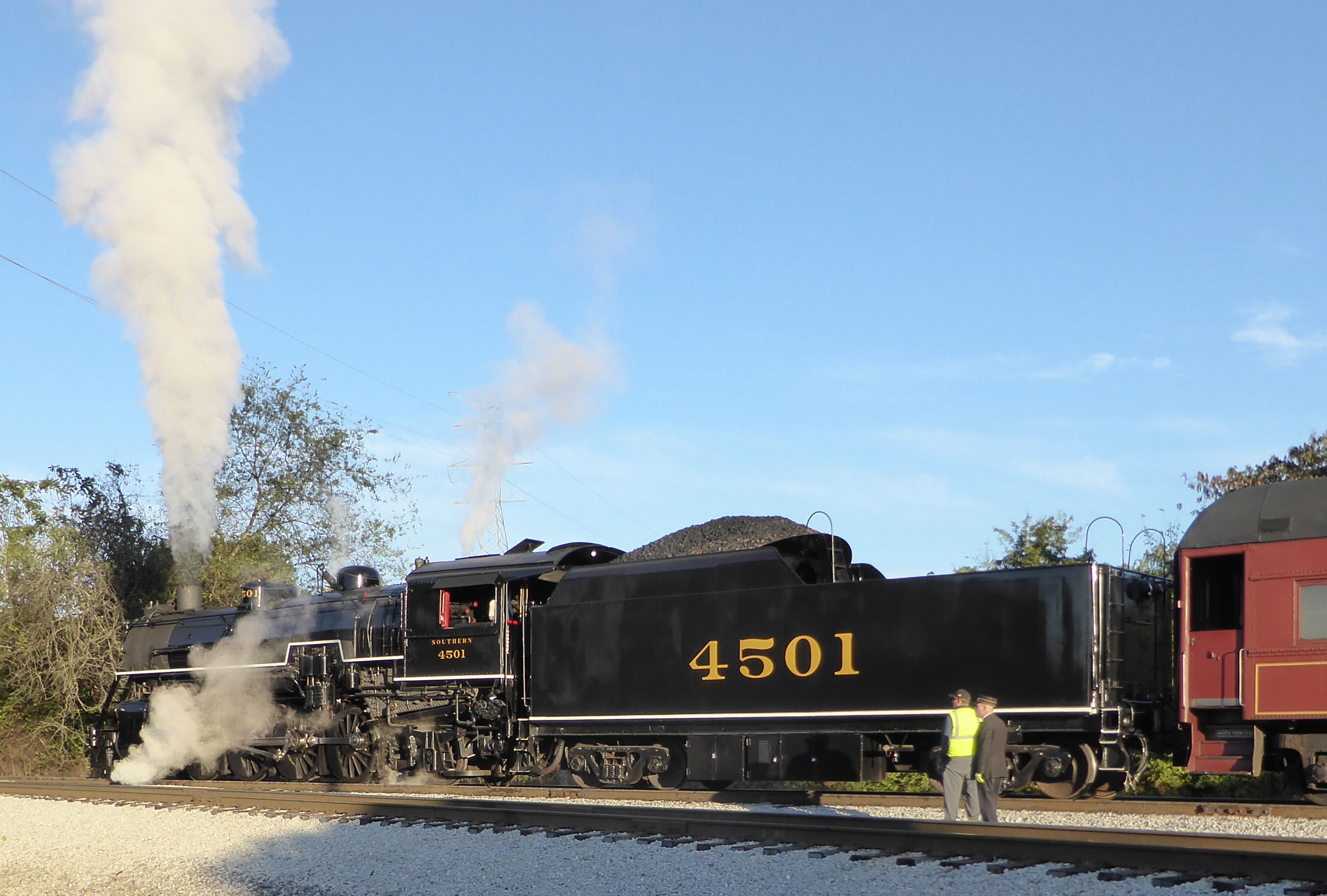
Southern Railway 4501 at the Tennessee Valley Railroad Museum

Almost all North American railroads rostered the type, notable exceptions being the Richmond, Fredericksburg & Potomac, the Boston & Maine, the Delaware & Hudson, the Western Maryland, the Cotton Belt and the Norfolk & Western. The largest users included the New York Central with 715 locomotives, the Baltimore & Ohio with 610, the Pennsylvania Railroad with 579, the Illinois Central with 565, the Milwaukee Road with 500, the Southern with 435, and the Chicago, Burlington & Quincy with 388.

A number of North American 2-8-2s have been preserved as either static display pieces, or steam excursion stars. These include Baltimore and Ohio 4500, Nickel Plate Road 587, Grand Trunk Western 4070, Southern Railway 4501, Grand Canyon Railway 4960, Spokane, Portland and Seattle 539, Southern Pacific 745, Tremont and Gulf 30, Duluth and Northern Minnesota 14, Soo Line 1003, McCloud Railway 18, McCloud Railway 19, Denver and Rio Grande Western 463, Pennsylvania Railroad 520, and California Western 45.

=== Yugoslavia ===
Borsig built 2-8-2s were delivered to the railway of the Kingdom of Yugoslavia in 1930. These became the JDZ class 06, of which a few remain in the former Yugoslav nations.
