= South African Katanga Mikado 2-8-2 =

1917 design of steam locomotive

South African Katanga Mikado 2-8-2 Bas Congo á Katanga Class 201
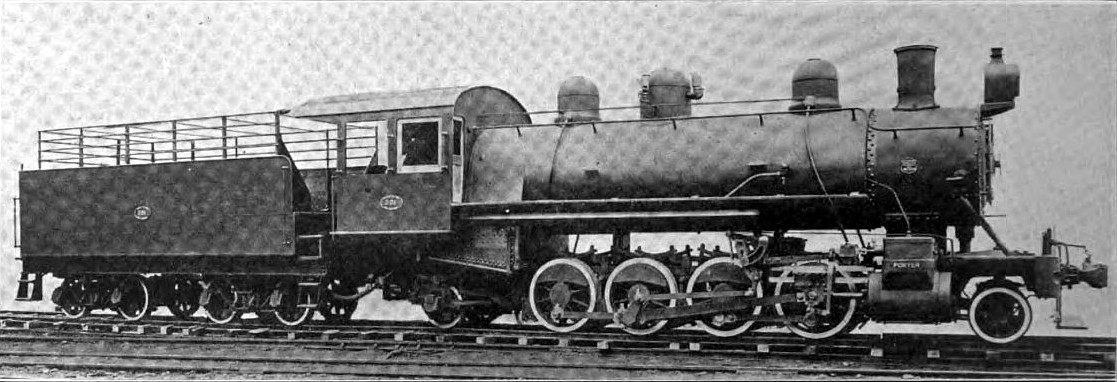
- Builder's picture of Katanga Mikado no. 201, c. 1917
Type and origin
- Power type: Steam
- Designer: H.K. Porter, Inc
- Builder: H.K. Porter, Inc
- Serial number: 5993-6016
- Model: BCK Class 200
- Build date: 1917
- Total produced: 24
Specifications
- Configuration
  - Whyte: 2-8-2 (Mikado)
  - UIC: 1′D1′ n2 as built 1′D1′ h2 reboilered
- Driver: 3rd coupled axle
- Gauge: 3 ft 6 in (1,067 mm) Cape gauge
- Coupled dia.: 44 in (1,118 mm)
- Wheelbase: 16,527 mm (54 ft 2.67 in)
  - Engine: 27 ft (8,230 mm)
  - Coupled: 12 ft 6 in (3,810 mm)
  - Tender: 5,485 mm (17 ft 11.94 in)
  - Tender bogie: 1,625 mm (5 ft 3.98 in)
- Length
  - Over beams: 18,230 mm (59 ft 9.72 in)
- Frame type: Plate
- Axle load: 13 LT 12 cwt (13,820 kg)
- Adhesive weight: 122,000 lb (55,340 kg)
- Loco weight: 152,000 lb (68,950 kg)
- Tender type: 2-axle bogies
- Fuel type: Wood
- Firebox
  - Type: Round-top
  - Grate area: 36.7 sq ft (3.41 m^{2})
- Boiler
  - Pitch: 2,897 mm (9 ft 6.06 in)
  - Tube plates: 5,087 mm (200.28 in)
  - Small tubes: 236: 51 mm (2.01 in)
- Boiler pressure: 210 psi (1,448 kPa)
- Heating surface
  - Firebox: 120.5 sq ft (11.19 m^{2})
  - Tubes: 2,059.5 sq ft (191.33 m^{2})
  - Total surface: 2,180 sq ft (203 m^{2})
- Cylinders: Two
- Cylinder size: 19 in (483 mm) bore 22 in (559 mm) stroke
- Valve gear: Walschaerts
- Valve type: Slide
- Couplers: Johnston link-and-pin (SAR)
Performance figures
- Tractive effort: 32,219 lbf (143.32 kN) @ 75%
- Factor of adh.: 3.79
Career
- Operators: South African Railways; Beira & Mashonaland & Rhodesia; CF du Bas Congo á Katanga
- Class: BCK 201
- Number in class: SAR 4 or 6
- Numbers: BCK 201-224
- Nicknames: Katanga Mikado
- Delivered: 1917
- First run: 1917
- Withdrawn: 1970s

The South African Railways Katanga Mikado 2-8-2 of 1917 was a steam locomotive used in South Africa.

In 1917, the South African Railways placed at least four 2-8-2 Mikado type steam locomotives in service. They had been built for the Chemins de Fer du Bas Congo à Katanga (BCK) in the Belgian Congo and were obtained on temporary lease to alleviate the critical shortage of locomotives as a result of the First World War's disruption of locomotive production in Europe and the United Kingdom.

== First World War ==
As a result of the disruption caused by the First World War, no new Cape Gauge locomotives could be introduced on the South African Railways (SAR) during 1916 and, by 1917, the rolling stock position was rapidly becoming critical, particularly regarding locomotives. New engines were almost unobtainable and spare parts so scarce that repairs and general overhauls had to be postponed to the utmost to keep engines in service. By March 1919, after the end of the war, 187 new locomotives and fourteen spare tenders were on order or authorised.

== Manufacturer ==
To partly alleviate the locomotive shortage, the SAR was able to lease four (six according to one source) of twenty-four new 200 Class 2-8-2 Mikado type tender steam locomotives which were built by H.K. Porter, Inc. of Pittsburgh, Pennsylvania between June and October 1917 for the Chemins de Fer du Bas Congo au Katanga (BCK) in the Belgian Congo.

Six more of these engines were leased to the Beira and Mashonaland and Rhodesia Railways (BMR), which operated between Umtali in Southern Rhodesia and Beira in Mozambique and which also experienced a critical shortage of motive power. The locomotives were numbered in the BCK range from 201 to 224, but the engine numbers of the individual locomotives which were leased to the SAR and BMR are not known.

The arrangement was probably made possible because construction of the Congolese line from the Northern Rhodesian border to Port Francqui, for which the locomotives were intended, was just being completed at the time and the full complement of locomotives were not required immediately by the BCK.

== Characteristics ==
The locomotives used saturated steam and had Walschaerts valve gear with slide valves. Like many other Central African locomotives of the day, they were wood-burners and some modifications were required to adapt them to coal-burning on the SAR. In addition, their tenders and brake gear had been lost at sea and they had to be fitted with SAR tenders, which were pirated from unserviceable engines awaiting or undergoing repair. The required engine brake gear was designed in the Pretoria drawing office and manufactured in the Salvokop workshops.

== Service ==
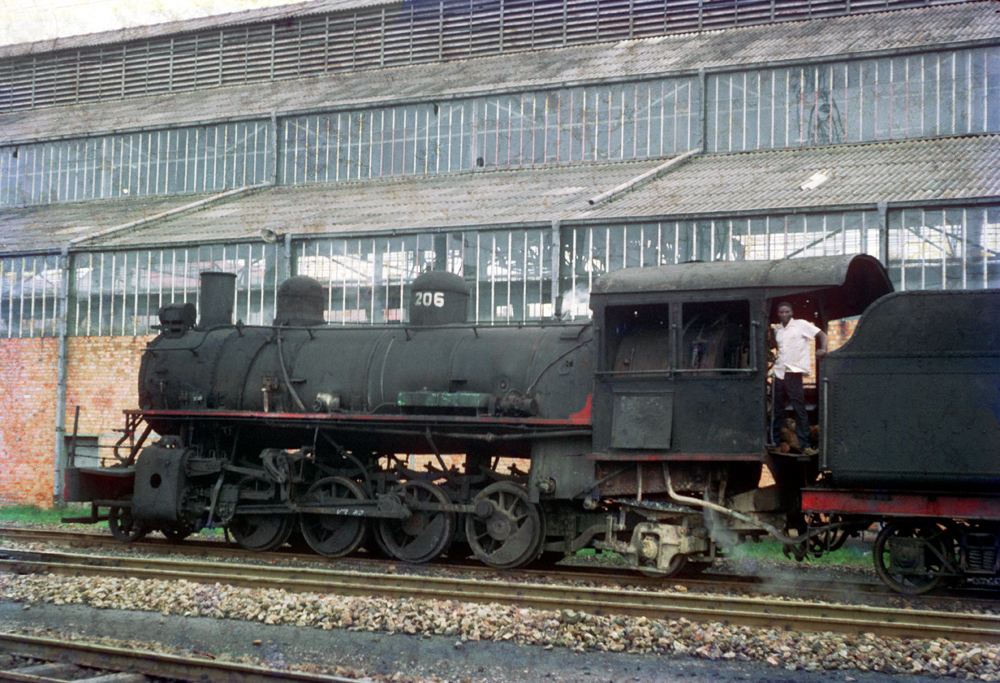
No. 206 at Lubumbashi, 2 February 1972

Even though the Katanga Mikados were considered to be of rather light construction, they proved to be extremely useful during that time of crisis. They were all forwarded to the Belgian Congo after the war.

In the 1930s eighteen of these locomotives were rebuilt with piston valves and superheated boilers. The superheated locomotives were reclassified 250 Class and renumbered in the range from 251 to 268. In 1955 more renumbering took place, with the remaining saturated steam engines being renumbered in the range from 219 to 224 and the superheated engines in the range from 201 to 218, again as 200 Class. The superheated engines survived to the end of steam in the Congo in the early 1970s, being employed on both shunting and line working.
