= South African Class NG5 2-8-2 =

1922 narrow-gauge steam locomotive

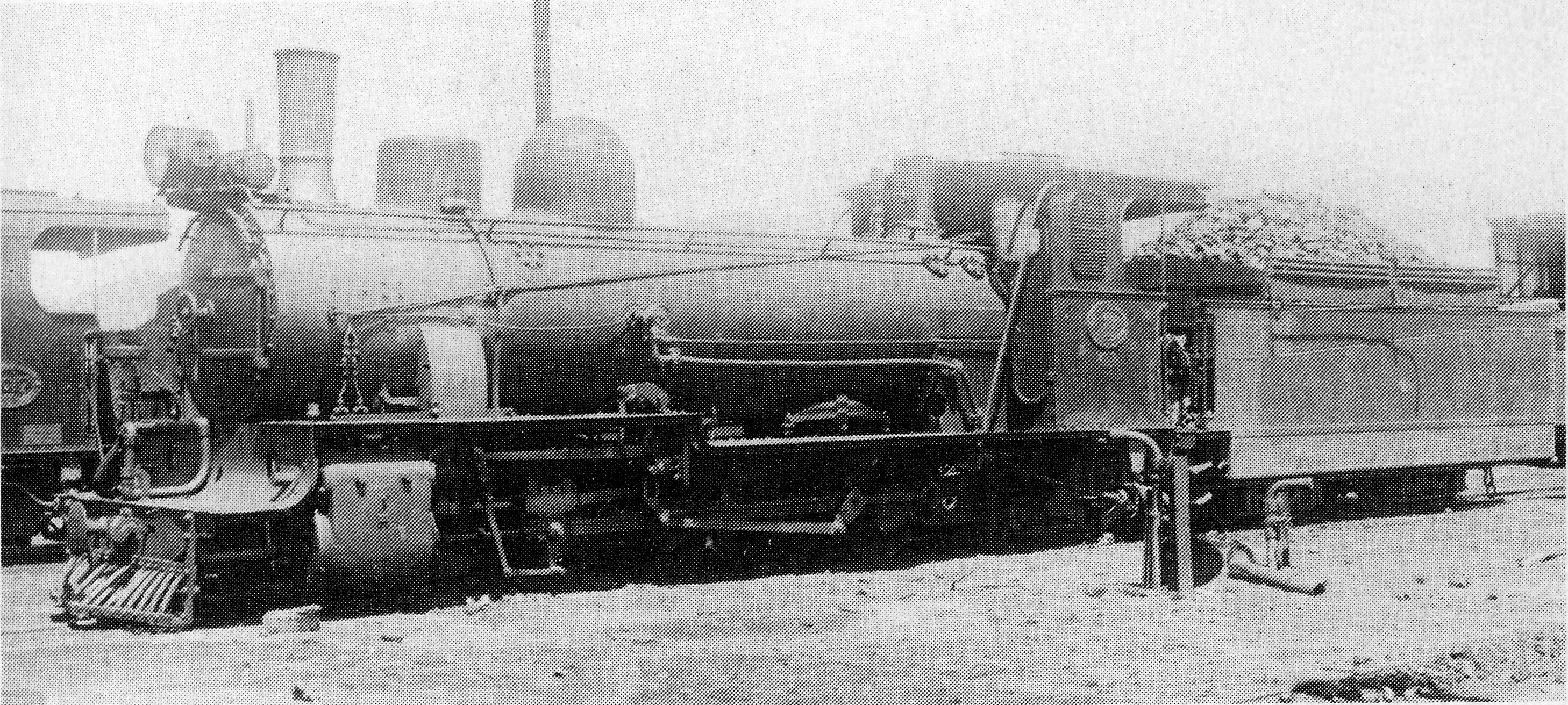
- Class NG5, c. 1960
Type and origin
- Power type: Steam
- Designer: Henschel & Son
- Builder: Henschel & Son
- Serial number: 18578-18583
- Model: Class NG5
- Build date: 1921
- Total produced: 6
Specifications
- Configuration
  - Whyte: 2-8-2
  - UIC: 1D1h2
- Driver: 3rd coupled axle
- Gauge: 600 mm (1 ft 11 5/8 in) narrow
- Leading dia.: 21 21/32 in (550 mm)
- Coupled dia.: 33 7/8 in (860 mm)
- Trailing dia.: 21 21/32 in (550 mm)
- Tender wheels: 20 1/2 in (521 mm)
- Wheelbase: 38 ft 6 5/8 in (11,751 mm)
  - Axle spacing (Asymmetrical): 1-2: 3 ft 1 7/16 in (951 mm); 2-3: 3 ft 4 1/8 in (1,019 mm); 3-4: 3 ft 1 7/16 in (951 mm)
  - Engine: 17 ft 11/16 in (5,199 mm)
  - Coupled: 9 ft 7 in (2,921 mm)
  - Tender: 11 ft 5 3/4 in (3,499 mm)
  - Tender bogie: 3 ft 3 3/8 in (1,000 mm)
- Length
  - Over couplers: 49 ft 9 1/4 in (15,170 mm)
- Height: 10 ft 9 15/16 in (3,300 mm)
- Frame type: Plate
- Loco weight: 32 LT 17 cwt (33,380 kg)
- Tender weight: 25 LT 11 cwt 3 qtr (26,000 kg)
- Total weight: 58 LT 8 cwt 3 qtr (59,380 kg)
- Tender type: 2-axle bogies
- Fuel type: Coal
- Fuel capacity: 2 LT 17 cwt (2.9 t)
- Water cap.: 2,860 imp gal (13,000 L)
- Firebox
  - Type: Round-top
  - Grate area: 16.7 sq ft (1.55 m^{2})
- Boiler
  - Pitch: 5 ft 8 7/8 in (1,749 mm)
  - Diameter: 3 ft 11 3/4 in (1,213 mm)
  - Tube plates: 13 ft 1 1/2 in (4,000 mm)
  - Small tubes: 114: 1 3/4 in (44 mm)
  - Large tubes: 12: 4 23/32 in (120 mm)
- Boiler pressure: 171 psi (1,179 kPa)
- Safety valve: Salter
- Heating surface
  - Firebox: 68 sq ft (6.3 m^{2})
  - Tubes: 880 sq ft (82 m^{2})
  - Total surface: 948 sq ft (88.1 m^{2})
- Superheater
  - Heating area: 145 sq ft (13.5 m^{2})
- Cylinders: Two
- Cylinder size: 15 3/4 in (400 mm) bore 17 3/4 in (451 mm) stroke
- Valve gear: Walschaerts
- Valve type: Slide
- Loco brake: Vacuum
- Train brakes: Vacuum
- Couplers: Buffer-and-chains
Performance figures
- Tractive effort: 16,610 lbf (73.9 kN) @ 75%
Career
- Operators: South African Railways
- Class: Class NG5
- Number in class: 6
- Numbers: NG71-NG76
- Delivered: 1922
- First run: 1922
- Withdrawn: 1960

The South African Railways Class NG5 2-8-2 of 1922 was a class of narrow-gauge steam locomotives.

In 1922, the South African Railways placed six narrow-gauge steam locomotives with a 2-8-2 Mikado type wheel arrangement in service on the Otavi Railway in South West Africa. When a system of grouping narrow-gauge locomotives into classes was eventually introduced somewhere between 1928 and 1930, they were designated Class NG5.

== Manufacturer ==
Six narrow-gauge 2-8-2 steam locomotives were built for the South African Railways (SAR) by Henschel and Son in Germany in 1921. They were built to the same design as the three Class Hd locomotives which had been built in 1912 for the German administration in German South West Africa (GSWA) for leasing to the Otavi Mining and Railway Company. The locomotives, numbered in the range from NG71 to NG76, were delivered in 1922.

== Characteristics ==
Like their predecessor Class Hd, they were superheated, with Walschaerts valve gear and outside plate frames. The new locomotives differed from the Class Hd in having different boilers, which were of the same dimensions but with a different tube arrangement and, as a consequence, a slightly reduced total heating surface.

In keeping with SAR practice at the time, they had vacuum train brakes instead of the air brakes which the Class Hd was equipped with. They had slide valves which was unusual on a superheated locomotive, instead of piston valves like the Class Hd. As built, the sand boxes were mounted on top of the boiler between the chimney and the steam dome.

Their rigidly mounted leading and trailing carrying wheels were also arranged as radial axles to allow for sideways motion of the wheels in relation to the locomotive frame, since the locomotive did not have separate bogie trucks. As on the Class Hd, this resulted in a rigid wheelbase of 17 feet 11/16 inch (5,199 millimetres), even though the leading carrying wheels were arranged to the rear instead of ahead of the cylinders.

== Classification ==
In service, these six locomotives and the three Class Hd locomotives were operated in a common pool. The system of grouping narrow-gauge locomotives into classes was only adopted by the SAR at some date between 1928 and 1930. At that point, these six locomotives and the three Class Hd locomotives were all designated Class NG5.

== Service ==
The 1922-vintage Class NG5 was placed in service on the 352-mile-long (566-kilometre) narrow-gauge line from Swakopmund on the Atlantic coast to Tsumeb and Grootfontein in South West Africa (SWA). They spent their whole service life in SWA, except for a brief period when one of them was sent to the Avontuur Railway in the Eastern Cape for trials. However, since it jammed on the tighter curves in the Langkloof despite having one set of flangeless coupled wheels, it was soon returned to SWA.

The Class NG5 were all withdrawn from service when the narrow-gauge system in SWA was regauged to Cape gauge in 1960. Since they were unsuitable for use in the Langkloof, all six 1922-vintage Class NG5 locomotives were sold as scrap in 1962.

== Preservation ==
While all of the Class NG5 were scrapped, two of the similar Class Hd locomotives have been preserved and plinthed at Otjiwarongo and Usakos respectively.
