= SNCF Class X 52100 =

Class of 10 French diesel-railcars

X 52100 (builder using: Autorail Decauville X ABDP2)
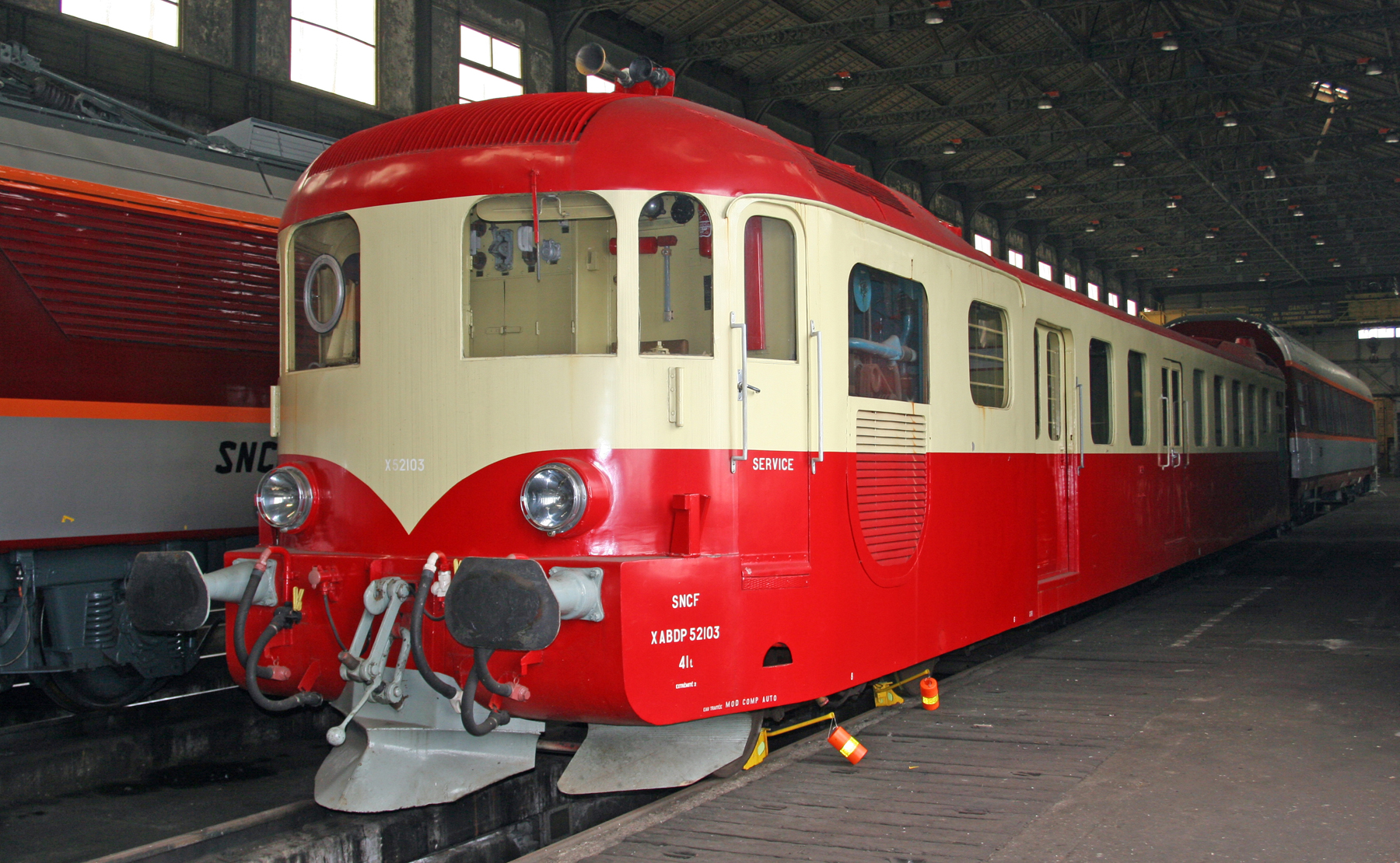
- Preserved example, unit number X52103, shown in 2009.
- Manufacturer: Société Decauville Ainé
- Constructed: 1945-1946
- Entered service: 1945-1973
- Number built: 10
- Number preserved: 1
- Number scrapped: 9
- Fleet numbers: X 52101 to X 52110
- Capacity: 65 seats: First class: 16; Second class: 46; 4 folding seats in luggage compartment with a 1.5 ton capacity
- Operators: SNCF
- Depots: Grenoble
- Lines served: Ligne des Alpes, Grenoble-Veynes, Grenoble-Marseille and Grenoble-Briançon, also seen on regional lines to Digne, Geneva, Bourg Saint-Maurice and Modano.

Specifications
- Car length: 21.2 m (69 ft 6 3/4 in) over buffers
- Maximum speed: 110 km/h (68 mph)
- Weight: 41 t (40 long tons; 45 short tons)
- Prime mover(s): Two 320 hp Saurer BZDSe powering two 1450 W auxiliary generators
- Engine type: Diesel
- Traction motors: Four Oerlikon electric motors
- Power output: 640 hp (480 kW)
- Track gauge: 1,435 mm (4 ft 8 1/2 in)

The SNCF X 52100 class are diesel railcars that operated on the alpine lines from Grenoble, France from 1945 until 1973. They were capable of multiple unit operation with other car types, requiring an operator in each car; the lead conductor giving acceleration or deceleration orders using an audible tone.

These were the first diesel-electric railcars used by the SNCF

== Routes Served ==
The X 52100 units were used on the mountain lines out of Grenoble.

== Preserved Units ==
Only one example was preserved. X 52103 is owned by Cité du Train in operating condition. Preserved by the SNCF, it was restored by the Oullins-Voitures workshop in 1976 and donated to Cité du Train in 1988.
